Fleuve Noir Anticipation was a science fiction collection by Fleuve Noir, a French publishing company, which encompassed 2001 novels published from 1951 to 1997. Aimed at a broad audience, Fleuve Noir Anticipation was originally conceived to publish books addressing the rumored rise of technocracy in the French Fourth Republic; but later focused on space opera and topics of popular interest.

The imprint exerted great influence on French science fiction and launched the career of several noted French writers including Stefan Wul, Kurt Steiner, Louis Thirion, Doris and Jean-Louis Le May, Richard Bessière, Jimmy Guieu and B. R. Bruss.

History
Fleuve Noir Anticipation was launched in September 1951. It consisted of paperback books sold at a low price but distinguished by sophisticated cover art by René Brantonne. Topics followed the tastes of the period, with more than half of the titles published in the 1950s and 60s belonging to the space opera genre.

Fleuve noir cultivated mostly "house writers", notably Jimmy Guieu and F. Richard-Bessière. But it also recruited young French-language authors, and motivated thriller writers to try writing science fiction, such as Georges-Jean Arnaud, who published his first genre texts in the series. According to George Edgar Slusser, Fleuve Noir Anticipation was where the leading French science fiction authors of the 1970s published their first novels.

List of novels
Numbering the books published under the Fleuve Noir Anticipation imprint is complicated because some were republished and some were initially published hors série, outside of the series. Lists of the entire series were compiled by Roland C. Wagner in the last volume of the collection and by Alain Douilly.

1950s

1951 
 Les Conquérants de l'univers by F. Richard-Bessière
 À l'assaut du ciel by F. Richard-Bessière
 Retour du "Météore" by F. Richard-Bessière
 Planète vagabonde by F. Richard-Bessière
 Le Pionnier de l'atome by Jimmy Guieu

1952 
 Croisière dans le temps by F. Richard-Bessière
 Les Chevaliers de l'espace by Jean-Gaston Vandel
 Au-delà de l'infini by Jimmy Guieu
 Les Fabricants de Soleil by Vargo Statten
 Le Satellite artificiel by Jean-Gaston Vandel
 Les Astres morts by Jean-Gaston Vandel
 Le Maître de Saturne by Vargo Statten
 L'Invasion de la Terre by Jimmy Guieu
 La Planète pétrifiée by Vargo Statten
 Alerte aux robots ! by Jean-Gaston Vandel
 La Flamme cosmique by Vargo Statten

1953 
 Frontières du vide by Jean-Gaston Vandel
 Hantise sur le monde by Jimmy Guieu
 Le Soleil sous la mer by Jean-Gaston Vandel
 Course vers Pluton by Vargo Statten
 Attentat cosmique by Jean-Gaston Vandel
 L'Univers vivant by Jimmy Guieu
 Infernale menace by Vargo Statten
 Incroyable futur by Jean-Gaston Vandel
 L'Héritage de la Lune by Vargo Statten
 Agonie des civilisés by Jean-Gaston Vandel
 La Dimension X by Jimmy Guieu
 Le Martien vengeur by Vargo Statten
 Pirate de la Science by Jean-Gaston Vandel

1954 
 Piège dans le temps by Rog Phillips
 Nous les Martiens by Jimmy Guieu
 La Bombe "G" by Vargo Statten
 S.O.S. soucoupes by B. R. Bruss
 Fuite dans l'inconnu by Jean-Gaston Vandel
 Îles de l'espace by Arthur C. Clarke
 La Spirale du temps by Jimmy Guieu
 Sauvetage sidéral by F. Richard-Bessière
 Métal de mort by Vargo Statten
 Naufragés des galaxies by Jean-Gaston Vandel
 La Guerre des soucoupes by B. R. Bruss
 Le Monde oublié by Jimmy Guieu
 À travers les âges by Vargo Statten
 Territoire robot by Jean-Gaston Vandel
 Sur la planète rouge by Isaac Asimov, writing as Paul French
 L'Homme de l'espace by Jimmy Guieu
 Duel des mondes by Vargo Statten

1955 
 Opération Aphrodite by Jimmy Guieu
 Les Titans de l'énergie by Jean-Gaston Vandel
 La Force invisible by Vargo Statten
 L'Autre univers by Volsted Gridban
 Commandos de l'espace by Jimmy Guieu
 Raid sur delta by Jean-Gaston Vandel
 Heure zéro by Vargo Statten
 L'Agonie du verre by Jimmy Guieu
 "S.O.S. Terre" by F. Richard-Bessière
 Départ pour l'avenir by Jean-Gaston Vandel
 Les Mines du ciel by Volsted Gridban
 Univers parallèles by Jimmy Guieu
 Opération interstellaire by George Oliver Smith
 Vingt pas dans l'inconnu by F. Richard-Bessière
 Bureau de l'invisible by Jean-Gaston Vandel

1956 
 Nos ancêtres de l'avenir by Jimmy Guieu
 Hommes en double by Vargo Statten
 Feu dans le ciel by F. Richard-Bessière
 Rideau magnétique by B. R. Bruss
 Les Voleurs de cerveaux by Murray Leinster
 Les Voix de l'univers by Jean-Gaston Vandel
 Révolte des triffides by John Wyndham
 Objectif Soleil by F. Richard-Bessière
 Les Monstres du néant by Jimmy Guieu
 Attaque sub-terrestre by Max-André Rayjean
 Prisonniers du passé by Jimmy Guieu
 La Foudre anti-D by Jean-Gaston Vandel
 L'Étoile fugitive by Vargo Statten
 Altitude moins X by F. Richard-Bessière
 Le Vide incandescent by Vector Magroon
 Le Troisième Bocal by Jean-Gaston Vandel
 Retour à "O" by Stefan Wul
 Mystérieux délai by Vargo Statten
 Les Êtres de feu by Jimmy Guieu
 Route du néant by F. Richard-Bessière
 Substance "ARKA" by B. R. Bruss

1957 
 Niourk by Stefan Wul
 Je reviens de... by Kemmel
 Cité de l'esprit by F. Richard-Bessière
 Base spatiale 14 by Max-André Rayjean
 La Mort de la vie by Jimmy Guieu
 L'Homme de deux mondes by Vargo Statten
 Création cosmique by F. Richard-Bessière
 Rayons pour Sidar by Stefan Wul
 Le Règne des mutants by Jimmy Guieu
 La Porte vers l'infini by Leigh Brackett
 Planète de mort by F. Richard-Bessière
 Transmission Z by Vargo Statten
 Créatures des neiges by Jimmy Guieu
 La Peur géante by Stefan Wul
 La Deuxième Terre by F. Richard-Bessière
 Retour à demain by L. Ron Hubbard
 L'Homme multiple by Vargo Statten
 Cité Noë n°2 by Jimmy Guieu
 Via dimension 5 by F. Richard-Bessière
 Oms en série by Stefan Wul
 Le Rayon du cube by Jimmy Guieu
 Les Parias de l'atome by Max-André Rayjean
 Fléau de l'univers by F. Richard-Bessière
 Le Temple du passé by Stefan Wul

1958 
 Le Navire étoile by Edwin Charles Tubb
 Chocs en synthèse by Max-André Rayjean
 L'Orphelin de Perdide by Stefan Wul
 Convulsions solaires by Jimmy Guieu
 Carrefour du temps by F. Richard-Bessière
 Le Grand Kirn by B. R. Bruss
 La Mort vivante by Stefan Wul
 La Folie verte by Max-André Rayjean
 Réseau dinosaure by Jimmy Guieu
 L'Autre côté du monde by Murray Leinster
 Relais Minos III by F. Richard-Bessière
 La Force sans visage by Jimmy Guieu
 Piège sur Zarkass by Stefan Wul
 Opération Espace by Murray Leinster
 Bang ! by F. Richard-Bessière
 L'Anneau des invincibles by Max-André Rayjean
 Les Transformés by John Wyndham
 Menace d'outre-Terre by Kurt Steiner
 Verte Destinée by Kenneth Bulmer
 Zone spatiale interdite by F. Richard-Bessière
 Soleils : échelle zéro by Max-André Rayjean

1959 
 Qui parle de conquête by Lan Wright
 Panique dans le vide by F. Richard-Bessière
 Terminus 1 by Stefan Wul
 Salamandra by Kurt Steiner
 Mission dans l'espace by Charles Frederick W. Chilton
 Prélude à l'espace by Arthur C. Clarke
 Expédition cosmique by Jimmy Guieu
 Le Troisième astronef by F. Richard-Bessière
 Terre… Siècle 24 by B. R. Bruss
 Le Monde de l'éternité by Max-André Rayjean
 Odyssée sous contrôle by Stefan Wul
 Ceux de demain by F. Richard-Bessière
 Les Cristaux de Capella by Jimmy Guieu
 Les Enfants du chaos by Maurice Limat
 Ère cinquième by Max-André Rayjean
 An... 2391 by B. R. Bruss
 Réaction déluge by F. Richard-Bessière
 Piège dans l'espace by Jimmy Guieu
 Le 32 juillet by Kurt Steiner
 Le Sang du Soleil by Maurice Limat
 On a hurlé dans le ciel by F. Richard-Bessière

1960s

1960 
 Chasseurs d'hommes by Jimmy Guieu
 La Troisième race by Poul Anderson
 Le Péril des hommes by Max-André Rayjean
 Survie by Peter Randa
 Terre degré "0" by F. Richard-Bessière
 J'écoute l'univers by Maurice Limat
 Aux armes d'Ortog by Kurt Steiner
 Les Sphères de Rapa-nui by Jimmy Guieu
 Générations perdues by F. Richard-Bessière
 "Baroud" by Peter Randa
 Métro pour l'inconnu by Maurice Limat
 L'Ère des Biocybs by Jimmy Guieu
 L'Ultra-univers by Max-André Rayjean
 Les Pantins d'Outre-ciel by F. Richard-Bessière
 Expérimental X-35 by Jimmy Guieu
 Les Foudroyants by Maurice Limat
 Chirurgiens d'une planète by Gilles d'Argyre
 Escale chez les vivants by F. Richard-Bessière
 Invasion "H" by Max-André Rayjean
 Les Frelons d'or by Peter Randa
 Les Lunes de Jupiter by F. Richard-Bessière
 Moi, un robot by Maurice Limat

1961 
 Puissance : facteur 3 by Max-André Rayjean
 Les Voiliers du soleil by Gilles d'Argyre
 Le Carnaval du cosmos by Maurice Limat
 Planète en péril by Jimmy Guieu
 Destination moins J-C. by F. Richard-Bessière
 Les Rescapés de demain by Peter Randa
 Les Magiciens d'Andromède by Max-André Rayjean
 Océan, mon esclave by Maurice Limat
 Plus égale moins by F. Richard-Bessière
 L'Anneau des Djarfs by B. R. Bruss
 La Caverne du futur by Jimmy Guieu
 Cycle zéro by Peter Randa
 Légion alpha by F. Richard-Bessière
 Message des Vibrants by Maurice Limat
 Commando de transplantation by Peter Randa
 Bihil by B. R. Bruss
 La Grande épouvante by Jimmy Guieu
 Les Mutants sonnent le glas by F. Richard-Bessière
 L'Étoile de Goa by Max-André Rayjean
 Les Damnés de Cassiopée by Maurice Limat
 L'Invisible alliance by Jimmy Guieu
 La Guerre des dieux by F. Richard-Bessière

1962 
 Au bout du ciel by Kemmel
 Fugitif de l'espace by Peter Randa
 Le Cri des Durups by B. R. Bruss
 Lumière qui tremble by Maurice Limat
 Planètes captives by Max-André Rayjean
 Les Poumons de Ganymède by F. Richard-Bessière
 Le Secret des Tshengz by Jimmy Guieu
 Le Mur de la lumière by B. R. Bruss
 Les Derniers jours de Sol 3 by F. Richard-Bessière
 Les Éphémères by Peter Randa
 Opération Ozma by Jimmy Guieu
 Les Fils de l'espace by Maurice Limat
 Les 7 anneaux de Rhéa by F. Richard-Bessière
 S.O.S. Lune by Arthur C. Clarke
 Naufragés de la Lune by Arthur C. Clarke
 Les Horls en péril by B. R. Bruss
 Deucalion by Peter Randa
 Micro-invasion by F. Richard-Bessière
 L'Anti-monde by Maurice Limat
 L'Âge noir de la Terre by Jimmy Guieu
 Les Apprentis sorciers by Peter Randa
 La Mort vient des étoiles by F. Richard-Bessière
 Dans le vent du cosmos by Maurice Limat
 L'Eau épaisse by Philip Levene and Joseph Lawrence Morrissey

1963 
 L'Oasis du rêve by Max-André Rayjean
 Les Créatures d'Hypnôs by Maurice Limat
 Mission "T" by Jimmy Guieu
 Les Ancêtres by Peter Randa
 Terrom, âge "un" by Max-André Rayjean
 Visa pour Antarès by F. Richard-Bessière
 La Guerre contre le Rull by Alfred Elton Van Vogt
 Les Forbans de l'espace by Jimmy Guieu
 Complot Vénus-Terre by B. R. Bruss
 Le Crépuscule des humains by Maurice Limat
 Plate-forme de l'éternité by Peter Randa
 Les Jardins de l'apocalypse by F. Richard-Bessière
 La Fièvre rouge by Max-André Rayjean
 Le Sang vert by Maurice Limat
 Projet "King" by Jimmy Guieu
 Planète à vendre by F. Richard-Bessière
 L'Otarie bleue by B. R. Bruss
 Humains de nulle part by Peter Randa
 Les Sortilèges d'Altaïr by Maurice Limat
 Rendez-vous sur un monde perdu by Arthur Bertram Chandler
 Les Destructeurs by Jimmy Guieu
 Pas de Gonia pour les Gharkandes by F. Richard-Bessière
 Une mouche nommée Drésa by B. R. Bruss

1964 
 Projet "Kozna" by Max-André Rayjean
 L'Étoile de Satan by Maurice Limat
 Les Portes de Thulé by Jimmy Guieu
 Le Long voyage by Gilles d'Argyre
 Alerte en galaxie by F. Richard-Bessière
 Sédition by Peter Randa
 Les Translucides by B. R. Bruss
 Round végétal by Max-André Rayjean
 Échec au Soleil by Maurice Limat
 La Loi de Mandralor by Peter Randa
 Un futur pour M. Smith by F. Richard-Bessière
 L'Astéroïde noir by B. R. Bruss
 Particule zéro by Maurice Limat
 Zone de rupture by Peter Randa
 L'Escale des Zulhs by Max-André Rayjean
 La Planète géante by F. Richard-Bessière
 Le Grand feu by B. R. Bruss
 Ici finit le monde by Maurice Limat
 Retour en Argara by Peter Randa
 N'accusez pas le ciel by F. Richard-Bessière

1965 
 Le Soleil s'éteint by B. R. Bruss
 L'Astre vivant by Max-André Rayjean
 Les Soleils noirs by Maurice Limat
 Les Tueurs de temps by Gilles d'Argyre
 Les Pionniers du cosmos by F. Richard-Bessière
 Reconquête by Peter Randa
 Fréquence "ZZ" by Maurice Limat
 Planètes oubliées by B. R. Bruss
 Le Chemin des étoiles by F. Richard-Bessière
 Les Improbables by Kurt Steiner
 Les Forçats de l'énergie by Max-André Rayjean
 Qui suis-je ? by Peter Randa
 Disparus dans l'espace by Peter Randa
 La Planète glacée by B. R. Bruss
 Le Flambeau du monde by Maurice Limat
 Le Cerveau de Silstar by Max-André Rayjean
 Le Secret des Antarix by Peter Randa
 L'Énigme des Phtas by B. R. Bruss
 Methoodias by Maurice Limat
 Les Maîtres du silence by F. Richard-Bessière
 Je m'appelle... "tous" by F. Richard-Bessière
 A comme Andromède by John Elliot and Fred Hoyle

1966 
 Andromède revient by John Elliot and Fred Hoyle
 Planétoïde 13 by Maurice Limat
 Le Zoo des Astors by Max-André Rayjean
 Les Limiers de l'infini by Pierre Barbet
H.S Opération Astrée by Clark Darlton and Karl-Herbert Scheer
 La Solitude des dieux by Peter Randa
 La Guerre des robots by B. R. Bruss
 Rien qu'une étoile by Maurice Limat
 Les Mages de Dereb by F. Richard-Bessière
 La Terre a peur by Karl-Herbert Scheer
 Plan S.03 by Max-André Rayjean
 Les Cavernicoles de Wolf by Pierre Barbet
 Agent spatial n°1 by F. Richard-Bessière
 L'Espace noir by B. R. Bruss
 La Milice des mutants by Karl-Herbert Scheer
 La Terre n'est pas ronde by Maurice Limat
 Commando du non-retour by Peter Randa
 Bases sur Vénus by Karl-Herbert Scheer
 Vagues d'invasion by Peter Randa
 Cerveaux sous contrôle by F. Richard-Bessière
 La Créature éparse by B. R. Bruss
 Le Soleil de glace by Maurice Limat
 Les Clés de l'univers by Max-André Rayjean
 La Chasse à l'impondérable by Doris Le May and Jean-Louis Le May
 Objectif Tamax by Peter Randa
 Inversia by F. Richard-Bessière
 Les Vainqueurs de Véga by Clark Darlton and Karl-Herbert Scheer

1967 
 Le Dieu couleur de nuit by Maurice Limat
 L'Étoile du néant by Pierre Barbet
 La Vermine du Lion by F. Carsac
 Les Anti-hommes by Max-André Rayjean
 L'Oenips d'Orlon by Doris Le May and Jean-Louis Le May
 La Forteresse des six lunes by Clark Darlton and Karl-Herbert Scheer
 L'Astronef pirate by Murray Leinster
 Les Océans du ciel by Kurt Steiner
 La Grande dérive by Peter Randa
 Les Oiseaux de Véga by Maurice Limat
 Le Mystère des Sups by B. R. Bruss
 Le Secret des Quasars by Pierre Barbet
 Cette lueur qui venait des ténèbres by F. Richard-Bessière
 La Quête cosmique by Clark Darlton and Karl-Herbert Scheer
 Le Septième continent by Max-André Rayjean
 Les Survivants de Kor by Peter Randa
 L'Étrange planète Orga by B. R. Bruss
 Les Portes de l'aurore by Maurice Limat
 Les Glaces de Gol by Clark Darlton and Karl-Herbert Scheer
 Les Drogfans de Gersande by Doris Le May and Jean-Louis Le May
 Le Trappeur galactique by B. R. Bruss
 L'Enfer dans le ciel by F. Richard-Bessière
 Hallali cosmique by Pierre Barbet
 Les Ides de Mars by Peter Randa
 Le Traître de Tuglan by Clark Darlton and Karl-Herbert Scheer
 Le Quatrième futur by Max-André Rayjean
 La Nuit des Géants by Maurice Limat
 Chaos sur la genèse by F. Richard-Bessière
 La Jungle d'Araman by Peter Randa
 Le Retour des dieux by Jimmy Guieu

1968 
 Quand l'uranium vint à manquer by B. R. Bruss
 L'Odyssée du Delta by Doris Le May and Jean-Louis Le May
 Le Maître des mutants by Clark Darlton and Karl-Herbert Scheer
 La Planète de feu by Maurice Limat
 Ne touchez pas aux Borloks by F. Richard-Bessière
 Les Sept sceaux du cosmos by Jimmy Guieu
 Contact "Z" by Max-André Rayjean
 La Planète des Cristophons by Pierre Barbet
 La Révolte des inexistants by Peter Randa
 Message pour l'avenir by Doris Le May and Jean-Louis Le May
 L'Espionne galactique by B. R. Bruss
 Le Piège à pirates by Clark Darlton and Karl-Herbert Scheer
 Évolution magnétique by Pierre Barbet
 Les Sirènes de Faô by Maurice Limat
 Joklun-N'Ghar la maudite by Jimmy Guieu
 Civilisation Oméga by Max-André Rayjean
 Les Stols by Louis Thirion
 L'Escale des dieux by Peter Randa
 La Planète introuvable by B. R. Bruss
 Le Sceptre du hasard by Gilles d'Argyre
 La Planète des Optyrox by Doris Le May and Jean-Louis Le May
 Tout commencera... hier by F. Richard-Bessière
 La Terreur invisible by Jimmy Guieu
 L'Empereur de New-York by Clark Darlton and Karl-Herbert Scheer
 Le Septième nuage by Maurice Limat
 L'Héritier des Sars by Peter Randa
 Le Zor-Ko de fer by Max-André Rayjean
 Des hommes, des hommes... et encore des hommes by F. Richard-Bessière
 Les Enfants d'Alga by B. R. Bruss
 Refuge cosmique by Jimmy Guieu
 Arel d'Adamante by Doris Le May and Jean-Louis Le May
 Les Aventuriers de l'espace by Peter Randa

1969 
 Ici l'infini by Maurice Limat
 Vikings de l'espace by Pierre Barbet
 La Machine venue d'ailleurs by F. Richard-Bessière
 L'Étoile en exil by Clark Darlton and Karl-Herbert Scheer
 Métalikus by Maurice Limat
 L'An un des Kréols by Max-André Rayjean
 Ortog et les ténèbres by Kurt Steiner
 Les Naufragés de l'Alkinoos by Louis Thirion
 La Grande chasse des Kadjars by Peter Randa
 Le Treizième signe du zodiaque by Maurice Limat
 Cauchemar dans l'invisible by F. Richard-Bessière
 La Neige bleue by Gérard Marcy
 Solution de continuité by Doris Le May and Jean-Louis Le May
 Les Chimères de Séginus by Pierre Barbet
 L'Ordre vert by Jimmy Guieu
 Mutants en mission by Clark Darlton and Karl-Herbert Scheer
 Les Centauriens sont fous by B. R. Bruss
 Relais "Kera" by Max-André Rayjean
 Les Enfants de l'histoire by Kurt Steiner
 Demain le froid by Doris Le May and Jean-Louis Le May
 L'Homme éparpillé by Peter Randa
 Flammes sur Titan by Maurice Limat
 L'Exilé du temps by Pierre Barbet
 Les Whums se vengent by Louis Thirion
 Parle, robot ! by B. R. Bruss
 Traquenard sur Kenndor by Jimmy Guieu
 Les Damnés d'Altaban by Peter Randa
 L'Offensive d'oubli by Clark Darlton and Karl-Herbert Scheer
 Tempête sur Coxxi by Maurice Limat
 La Quête du Frohle d'Esylée by Doris Le May and Jean-Louis Le May
 Les Marteaux de Vulcain by F. Richard-Bessière
 Les Boucles du temps by Peter Randa
 Demain : l'Apocalypse by Jimmy Guieu
 S.O.S. cerveaux by Max-André Rayjean

1970s

1970 
 Étoiles en perdition by Pierre Barbet
 Garadania by Georges Murcie
 On demande un cobaye by F. Richard-Bessière
 L'Arche du temps by Jimmy Guieu
 La Plongée des corsaires d'Hermos by Doris Le May and Jean-Louis Le May
 La Force secrète by Gérard Marcy
 Enjeu Déterna by Peter Randa
 Le Voleur de rêves by Maurice Limat
 A l'assaut d'Arkonis by Clark Darlton and Karl-Herbert Scheer
 Les Maîtres des pulsars by Pierre Barbet
 Prisonniers du temps by Max-André Rayjean
 Équipages en péril by Pierre Courcel
 La Mission d'Eno Granger by Doris Le May and Jean-Louis Le May
 Plus loin qu'Orion by Maurice Limat
 La Tache noire by Robert Clauzel
 La Planète aux oasis by B. R. Bruss
 Et le dernier humain mourut by Peter Randa
 La Menace des Moofs by Clark Darlton and Karl-Herbert Scheer
 Les Prisonniers de Kazor by F. Richard-Bessière
 La Planète maudite by Paul Béra
 Le Disque rayé by Kurt Steiner
 Le Triangle de la mort by Jimmy Guieu
 Les Grognards d'Eridan by Pierre Barbet
 Ysée-A by Louis Thirion
 Le Rendez-vous aux 300 000 by Georges Murcie
 Une si belle planète by B. R. Bruss
 Les Cosmatelots de Lupus by Maurice Limat
 Retour au néant by Max-André Rayjean
 La Trêve du sacre by Peter Randa
 La Planète piégée by Clark Darlton and Karl-Herbert Scheer
 Aux frontières de l'impossible by Robert Clauzel
 L'Agonie de la Voie lactée by Pierre Barbet
 Irimanthe by Doris Le May and Jean-Louis Le May
 Base "Djéos" by Max-André Rayjean
 Quatre "diables" au paradis by F. Richard-Bessière
 Plan catapulte by Jimmy Guieu
 L'Univers des Torgaux by Peter Randa
 Et la comète passa by Maurice Limat

1971 
 Vengeance en symbiose by Gérard Marcy
 Les Êtres de lumière by Paul Béra
 Les Montagnes mouvantes by Doris Le May and Jean-Louis Le May
 Les Méduses de Moofar by Clark Darlton and Karl-Herbert Scheer
 Les Conquistadores d'Andromède by Pierre Barbet
 Les Orgues de Satan by Jimmy Guieu
 Les Harnils by B. R. Bruss
 Le Cycle du recommencement by Peter Randa
 La Puissance de l'ordre by Georges Murcie
 La Seconde vie by Max-André Rayjean
 La Guerre des Gruulls by Alphonse Brutsche
 Un astronef nommé Péril by Maurice Limat
 Bases d'invasion by Pierre Courcel
 L'Horreur tombée du ciel by Robert Clauzel
 Sterga la noire by Louis Thirion
 Le Rideau de brume by André Caroff
 Terre d'arriérés by Paul Béra
 La Voix qui venait d'ailleurs by Jimmy Guieu
 Le Dépositaire de Thana by Peter Randa
 Concerto pour l'inconnu (opus 71) by F. Richard-Bessière
 Les Landes d'Achernar by Doris Le May and Jean-Louis Le May
 Le Transmetteur de Ganymède by Pierre Barbet
 Un de la galaxie by Maurice Limat
 Les Grottes de Gom by Clark Darlton and Karl-Herbert Scheer
 "Cellule 217" by Max-André Rayjean
 Les Rescapés du futur by Georges Murcie
 La Planète qui n'existait pas by Robert Clauzel
 Les Croisés de Mara by G.-J. Arnaud
 Le Grand mythe by Jimmy Guieu
 Azraëc de Virgo by Pierre Barbet
 Le Grand marginal by B. R. Bruss
 La Loi d'Algor by F. Richard-Bessière
 Moissons du futur by Maurice Limat
 Les Trophées de la cité morte by Doris Le May and Jean-Louis Le May
 Les Astronefs du pouvoir by Peter Randa
 Les Psycors de Pââl Zuick by Max-André Rayjean
 Planète de désolation by Peter Randa
 A quoi songent les Psyborgs ? by Pierre Barbet
 La Charnière du temps by Jimmy Guieu
 Destination épouvante by Robert Clauzel
 Variations sur une machine by F. Richard-Bessière
 Motel 113 by Georges Murcie
 Les Cristaux de Sigel Alpha by Doris Le May and Jean-Louis Le May
 La Planète aux chimères by Maurice Limat

1972 
 Luhora by B. R. Bruss
 Escales forcées by Pierre Courcel
 Adieu, Céred by Jacques Hoven
 La Guerre des Nosiars by André Caroff
 "Année 500.000" by Daniel Piret
 Le Missile hyperspatial by Gérard Marcy
 Les Immortels by Peter Randa
 Les Déracinés d'Humania by Dan Dastier
 L'Empire du Baphomet by Pierre Barbet
 L'Envoyé d'Alpha by Jan de Fast
 Enjeu cosmique by Jimmy Guieu
 Quand le ciel s'embrase by Maurice Limat
 Espace interdit by Paul Béra
 Comme il était au commencement... by Robert Clauzel
 Vacances spatiales by Doris Le May and Jean-Louis Le May
 Le Vaisseau de l'ailleurs by F. Richard-Bessière
 La Bataille de Bételgeuse by Clark Darlton and Karl-Herbert Scheer
 Objectif : la Terre ! by Georges Murcie
 Les Maîtres de la galaxie by Jimmy Guieu
 La Septième saison by Pierre Suragne
 Les Statues vivantes by Max-André Rayjean
 Les Pêcheurs d'étoiles by Maurice Limat
 Les Insurgés de Laucor by Pierre Barbet
 Les Monarques de Bi by G.-J. Arnaud
 Le Grand cristal de Terk by Peter Randa
 Les Êtres vagues by B. R. Bruss
 L'Arbre de cristal by Max-André Rayjean
 Les Êtres du néant by André Caroff
 La Planète assassinée by Jan de Fast
 Les Hydnes de Loriscamp by Doris Le May and Jean-Louis Le May
 Énergie - 500 by F. Richard-Bessière
 Race de conquérants by Paul Béra
 Le Monde de l'incréé by Robert Clauzel
 Mal Iergo le dernier by Pierre Suragne
 Le Tunnelumière by Georges Murcie
 Les Rescapés du néant by Jimmy Guieu
 La Loi des ancêtres by Peter Randa
 La Planète empoisonnée by Pierre Barbet
 Les Fruits du Métaxylia by Doris Le May and Jean-Louis Le May
 Les Deux soleils de Canaé by Daniel Piret
 L'Empereur de métal by Maurice Limat
 La Galaxie engloutie by Robert Clauzel
 L'Autre passé by Max-André Rayjean
 La Planète infernale by André Caroff
 L'Enfant qui marchait sur le ciel by Pierre Suragne
 Quand les soleils s'éteignent by F. Richard-Bessière
 Tremplins d'étoiles by Pierre Barbet
 Les Secrets d'Hypnoz by Dan Dastier
 Les Témoins de l'éternité by Peter Randa
 Les Créateurs d'Ulnar by Doris Le May and Jean-Louis Le May
 Les Grottes de Phobos by Georges Murcie

1973 
 Robinson du néant by Maurice Limat
 Lazaret 3 by G.-J. Arnaud
 Infection focale by Jan de Fast
 Le Dieu de lumière by Alphonse Brutsche
 L'Amiral d'Arkonis by Clark Darlton and Karl-Herbert Scheer
 La Loi du cube by Max-André Rayjean
 Le Secret d'Ipavar by Louis Thirion
 La Planète enchantée by Pierre Barbet
 A l'aube du dernier jour... by Robert Clauzel
 Le Rendez-vous de Nankino by Peter Randa
 La Mission effacée by Jimmy Guieu
 Il était une fois dans l'espace by Jacques Hoven
 La Nef des dieux by Pierre Suragne
 L'Empreinte de Shark Ergan by Doris Le May and Jean-Louis Le May
 Guet-apens sur Zifur by B. R. Bruss
 Les Possédés de Wolf 359 by Georges Murcie
 Ceux des ténèbres by André Caroff
 Les Égarés du temps by Daniel Piret
 1973... et la suite by F. Richard-Bessière
 S.O.S.... ici, nulle part ! by Maurice Limat
 Bulles d'univers by Paul Béra
 Messies pour l'avenir by Dan Dastier
 Les Cathédrales d'espace-temps by Robert Clauzel
 L'Impossible retour by Jan de Fast
 Les Marées du temps by Peter Randa
 Brang by B. R. Bruss
 Liane de Noldaz by Pierre Barbet
 Dame Lueen by Doris Le May and Jean-Louis Le May
 La Révolte de Gerkanol by Max-André Rayjean
 Mecanic Jungle by Pierre Suragne
 L'Exilé d'Akros by André Caroff
 Opération Neptune by Jimmy Guieu
 Mission au futur antérieur by Georges Murcie
 Les Replis du temps by Dan Dastier
 Le Sérum de survie by Clark Darlton and Karl-Herbert Scheer
 Les Bioniques d'Atria by Pierre Barbet
 La Terrible expérience de Peter Home by Robert Clauzel
 L'Étoile du silence by Maurice Limat
 Les Disques de Biem-Kara by Daniel Piret
 Génération spontanée by Peter Randa
 Et puis les loups viendront by Pierre Suragne
 Les Germes du Chaos by Jimmy Guieu
 Quatrième mutation by Jan de Fast
 Arlyada by Georges Murcie
 Les Trésors de Chrysoréade by Doris Le May and Jean-Louis Le May
 Le Bâtard d'Orion by Pierre Barbet
 Les Étoiles meurent aussi… by Robert Clauzel
 La Planète aux diamants by Dan Dastier
 Sombre est l'espace by Jacques Hoven
  by Clark Darlton and Karl-Herbert Scheer
 Le Monde figé by Max-André Rayjean
 La Jungle de fer by Maurice Limat
 La Planète perdue by Peter Randa
 Métrocéan 2031 by Louis Thirion
 Les Seigneurs de la nuit by F. Richard-Bessière

1974 
 Les Gardiens de l'Almucantar by Doris Le May and Jean-Louis Le May
 Cancer dans le cosmos by Jan de Fast
 Vahanara by Georges Murcie
 Le Maître de Phallaté by Daniel Piret
 Brebis galeuses by Kurt Steiner
 La Fantastique énigme de Pentarosa by Robert Clauzel
 L'Univers des Géons by Pierre Barbet
 Chevaliers du temps by Louis Thirion
 Les Tueurs d'âme by Jan de Fast
 Les Exilés d'Elgir by Clark Darlton and Karl-Herbert Scheer
 Les Veilleurs de Poséidon by Jimmy Guieu
 Oméga 5 by Georges Murcie
 Les Fils de l'Atlantide by Daniel Piret
 Complot à travers le temps by Peter Randa
 L'Invasion des invisibles by Clark Darlton and Karl-Herbert Scheer
 Les Immortels de Céphalia by Dan Dastier
 Vertige cosmique by Maurice Limat
 Magiciens galactiques by Pierre Barbet
 Les Feux de Siris by Max-André Rayjean
 Yétig de la nef monde by Doris Le May and Jean-Louis Le May
 Mais si les papillons trichent by Pierre Suragne
 Le Bagne de Rostos by André Caroff
 La Mort surgit du néant by Jan de Fast
 Les Ruches de M.112 by F. Richard-Bessière
 Le Poids du passé by Clark Darlton and Karl-Herbert Scheer
 Le Nuage qui vient de la mer by Robert Clauzel
 L'Exilé de Xantar by Jimmy Guieu
 Métamorphose by Peter Randa
 Les Mutants de Pshuuria by Dan Dastier
 Naître ou ne pas naître by Daniel Piret
 Les Mercenaires de Rychna by Pierre Barbet
 Planète polluée by Paul Béra
 Stellan by Doris Le May and Jean-Louis Le May
 Le Dieu truqué by Pierre Suragne
 La Citadelle cachée by Clark Darlton and Karl-Herbert Scheer
 Les Intemporels by Jacques Hoven
 De l'autre côté de l'atome by Georges Murcie
 Le Secret des Cyborgs by Max-André Rayjean
 Le Maître du temps by Jimmy Guieu
 Le Temps cyclothymique by Alphonse Brutsche
 Les Sept cryptes d'hibernation by Peter Randa
 Ballade pour presque un homme by Pierre Suragne
 La Drogue des étoiles by Jan de Fast
 L'Iceberg rouge by Maurice Limat
 Les Sources de l'infini by F. Richard-Bessière
 Quand les deux soleils se coucheront by Jan de Fast
 Croisade stellaire by Pierre Barbet
 Projet Apocalypse by Georges Murcie
 Ahouvati le Kobek by Daniel Piret
 Les Traquenards du temps by Clark Darlton and Karl-Herbert Scheer
 L'Espace d'un éclair by Maurice Limat
 Plate-forme Epsilon by Robert Clauzel
 Le Grand retour by Max-André Rayjean
 Les Massacres du commencement by Peter Randa
 Quand la machine s'emmêle by F. Richard-Bessière

1975 
 Manipulations psi by Jimmy Guieu
 La Planète aux deux soleils by Gabriel Jan
 Le Grand passage by Daniel Piret
 Un pilote a disparu by Doris Le May and Jean-Louis Le May
 Penelcoto by B. R. Bruss
 Sécession à Procyon by Jan de Fast
 Barrière vivante by Max-André Rayjean
 Le Bagne d'Edenia by Jean-Pierre Garen
 La Folie du capitaine Sangor by Georges Murcie
 Délos a disparu by Clark Darlton and Karl-Herbert Scheer
 Le Vieux et son implant by Paul Béra
 Les Portes du monde alpha by Dan Dastier
 La Barrière du grand isolement by Peter Randa
 La Révolte des Logars by Yann Menez
 Les Hordes de Céphée by Jan de Fast
 Les Pièges de Koondra by Jimmy Guieu
 Opération désespoir by Georges Murcie
 Échec à la raison by Doris Le May and Jean-Louis Le May
 Les Sub-terrestres by Maurice Limat
 L'Agonie d'Atlantis by Clark Darlton and Karl-Herbert Scheer
 La Saga des étoiles by Jan de Fast
 Le Tell de la puissance by Daniel Piret
 Les Résidus du temps by Peter Randa
 L'Astronef rouge by Max-André Rayjean
 La Moisson de Myrtha VII by Clark Darlton and Karl-Herbert Scheer
 Et la nuit garda son secret by Robert Clauzel
 La Nymphe de l'espace by Pierre Barbet
 Les Fugitifs de Zwolna by Jimmy Guieu
 Claine et les Solandres by Doris Le May and Jean-Louis Le May
 Où finissent les étoiles ? by Maurice Limat
 Les Naufragés du temps by Georges Murcie
 Dans la gueule du Vortex by Jan de Fast
 Pandémoniopolis by Gabriel Jan
 Le Onzième satellite by Daniel Piret
 Les Soleils de Siamed by Clark Darlton and Karl-Herbert Scheer
 La Brigade du grand sauvetage by Peter Randa
 Le Salut de l'empire Shekara by Jan de Fast
 Princesse des étoiles by Robert Clauzel
 La Nuit des Morphos by Dominique Rocher
 Les Hybrides de Michina by Georges Murcie
 Les Egrégores by Daniel Piret
 Les Krolls de Vorlna by Jimmy Guieu
 Maelström de Kjor by Maurice Limat
 Les Zwüls de Réhan by Gabriel Jan
 Le Rescapé de la Terre by Paul-Jean Hérault
 Ségrégaria by Max-André Rayjean
 La Vénus de l'Himménadrock by Jacques Hoven
 Tourbillon temporel by Jan de Fast
 Vendredi, by exemple... by Pierre Suragne
 Les Portes du futur by F. Richard-Bessière
 Zarnia, dimension folie by Dan Dastier
 L'Enjeu galactique by Peter Randa
 Il est minuit à l'univers by Maurice Limat
 Et la nuit fut... by F. Richard-Bessière
 L'Errant de l'éternité by Clark Darlton and Karl-Herbert Scheer

1976 
 Sakkara by Daniel Piret
 Orage magnétique by Jean-Pierre Garen
 L'Homme de lumière by Georges Murcie
 Nurnah aux temples d'or by Jan de Fast
 La Revanche du régent by Clark Darlton and Karl-Herbert Scheer
 Le Bouclier de Boongoha by Jimmy Guieu
 Orbite d'attente by Vincent Gallaix
 Les Walkyries des Pléiades by Jan de Fast
 La Nuit est morte by Paul Béra
 Les Survivants de Miderabi by Daniel Piret
 Les Géants de Komor by Max-André Rayjean
 Une porte sur ailleurs by Jan de Fast
 Les Bâtisseurs du monde by Paul-Jean Hérault
 Ce monde qui n'est plus nôtre by Doris Le May and Jean-Louis Le May
 Patrouilleur du néant by Pierre Barbet
 La Lumière d'ombre by Maurice Limat
 La Stase achronique by Jimmy Guieu
 Zoomby by Vincent Gallaix
 La Chair des Vohuz by Gabriel Jan
 Vae Victis ! by Daniel Piret
 Mâa by Georges Murcie
 Les Damnés de l'espace by Jean-Pierre Garen
 Périls sur la galaxie by Peter Randa
 La Loi galactique by Jan de Fast
 Recrues pour le régent by Clark Darlton and Karl-Herbert Scheer
 La Dernière mort by Daniel Piret
 Transit pour l'infini by Christian Mantey
 Plus jamais le "France" by Doris Le May and Jean-Louis Le May
 La Colonie perdue by Jimmy Guieu
 Par le temps qui court... by Jan de Fast
 Astres enchaînés by Maurice Limat
 Un jour, l'oubli ... by Georges Murcie
 L'Éternité moins une… by Peter Randa
 Le Feu de Klo-Ora by Dan Dastier
 Énigme aux confins by Doris Le May and Jean-Louis Le May
 Les Hommes marqués by Gilles Thomas
 Les Tziganes du Triangle austral by Jan de Fast
 Le Rescapé du Gaurisankar by Daniel Piret
 Terreur sur Izaad by Gabriel Jan
 Comme un liseron by Paul Béra
 L'Autoroute sauvage by Gilles Thomas
 Le Prix du pouvoir by Clark Darlton and Karl-Herbert Scheer
 La Terre, échec et mat by Robert Clauzel
 L'Ophrys et les Protistes by Doris Le May and Jean-Louis Le May
 Les Assaillants by Peter Randa
 Attaque parallèle by Jean-Pierre Garen
 S.O.S. Andromède by Jan de Fast
 Les Incréés by Maurice Limat
 Pas même un dieu by Jean Mazarin
 L'An 22704 des Wans by Gabriel Jan
 L'Être polyvalent by Georges Murcie
 Les Germes de l'infini by Max-André Rayjean
 Le Manuscrit by Daniel Piret
 Black planet by Christian Mantey
 Ambassade galactique by Pierre Barbet
 Elteor by Peter Randa
 Miroirs d'univers by Maurice Limat
 Il était une voile parmi les étoiles by Doris Le May and Jean-Louis Le May
 La Planète suppliciée by Robert Clauzel
 Sogol by Daniel Piret
 La Déroute des Droufs by Clark Darlton and Karl-Herbert Scheer

1977 
 Le Cylindre d'épouvante by Robert Clauzel
 La Planète des normes by Jan de Fast
 La Révolte de Zarmou by Georges Murcie
 Enfants d'univers by Gabriel Jan
 La Croix des décastés by Gilles Thomas
 Cap sur la Terre by Maurice Limat
 Le Général des Galaxies by Jean Mazarin
 Un pas de trop vers les étoiles by Jan de Fast
 Démonia, planète maudite by Piet Legay
 La Mort en billes by Gilles Thomas
 Déjà presque la fin by F. Richard-Bessière
 Rhodan renie Rhodan by Clark Darlton and Karl-Herbert Scheer
 Les Brumes du Sagittaire by Frank Dartal
 La Planète folle by Paul-Jean Hérault
 L'Étoile Regatonne by Doris Le May and Jean-Louis Le May
 Les Irréels by Max-André Rayjean
 La Lumière de Thot by Jimmy Guieu
 L'Immortel et les invisibles by Clark Darlton and Karl-Herbert Scheer
 Xurantar by Daniel Piret
 Involution interdite by Jan de Fast
 Le Non-être by Georges Murcie
 Le Ciel sous la Terre by Robert Clauzel
 Défi dans l'uniformité by Doris Le May and Jean-Louis Le May
 Maloa by Gabriel Jan
 Les Arches de Noé by Peter Randa
 Quand elles viendront by Chris Burger
 Les Diablesses de Qiwâm by Maurice Limat
 Un fils pour la lignée by Jean Mazarin
 Mondes en dérive by Jan de Fast
 Les Métamorphes de Moluk by Clark Darlton and Karl-Herbert Scheer
 Pari-Egar by Georges Murcie
 Le Secret des initiés by Jean-Pierre Garen
 Le Sursis d'Hypnos by Piet Legay
 Les Métamorphosés de Spalla by Max-André Rayjean
 La Cité au bout de l'espace by Pierre Suragne
 Commando HC - 9 by Karl-Herbert Scheer
 Les Couloirs de translation by Peter Randa
 L'Oeuf d'antimatière by Robert Clauzel
 Les Robots de Xaar by Gabriel Jan
 Les Légions de Bartzouk by Jimmy Guieu
 La Tour des nuages by Maurice Limat
 La Mort des dieux by Daniel Piret
 Au-delà des trouées noires by Dan Dastier
 Le Temps des autres by Chris Burger
 Les Neuf dieux de l'espace by Frank Dartal
 Les Esclaves de Thô by Jan de Fast
 Cette machine est folle by F. Richard-Bessière
 L'Arche des aïeux by Clark Darlton and Karl-Herbert Scheer
 Dal'nim by Doris Le May and Jean-Louis Le May
 La Courte éternité d'Hervé Girard by Georges Murcie
 L'Île des Bahalim by Daniel Piret
 Opération Epsilon by Jean-Pierre Garen
 Le Piège de lumière by Max-André Rayjean
 L'Élément 120 by Karl-Herbert Scheer
 Un monde de chiens by Jean Mazarin
 Les Ratés by Gilles Thomas
 Le Cycle des Algoans by Peter Randa
 Nuit d'émeute by Paul Béra
 Mortels horizons by Maurice Limat
 Alerte aux Antis by Clark Darlton and Karl-Herbert Scheer
 Seules les étoiles meurent by Jan de Fast
 Inu Shivan, dame de Shtar by Doris Le May and Jean-Louis Le May
 Les Dévoreurs d'âmes by Daniel Piret
 Les Maîtres de Gorka by Dan Dastier
 Les Naufragés de l'invisible by Robert Clauzel
 L'Affaire Pégasus by Karl-Herbert Scheer

1978 
 Les Sphères de l'oubli by Piet Legay
 Concentration 44 by Gabriel Jan
 Les Seigneurs de Kalaâr by Frank Dartal
 Les Voies d'Almagiel by Gilles Thomas
 Electronic man by André Caroff
 Le Caboteur cosmique by Clark Darlton and Karl-Herbert Scheer
 Commandos sur commande by Pierre Barbet
 Hier est né demain by Jan de Fast
 Principe Omicron by Maurice Limat
 Marga by Georges Murcie
 Les Vengeurs de Zylea by Dan Dastier
 C.C. 5 top secret by Karl-Herbert Scheer
 La Légende des niveaux fermés by Gilles Thomas
 Jar-qui-tue by Paul Béra
 L'Homme venu des étoiles by Peter Randa
 Mémoire génétique by Jean-Pierre Garen
 Quelques lingots d'iridium by Doris Le May and Jean-Louis Le May
 La Flotte fantôme by Clark Darlton and Karl-Herbert Scheer
 La Onzième dimension by Max-André Rayjean
 L'Ancêtre d'Irskaa by Daniel Piret
 La Forêt hurlante by Gabriel Jan
 Rhésus Y-2 by André Caroff
 Les Yeux de l'épouvante by Jimmy Guieu
 L'Homme qui vécut deux fois by F. Richard-Bessière
 Le Livre d'Éon by Frank Dartal
 Le Prince de métal by Robert Clauzel
 L'Homme qui partit pour les étoiles by Peter Randa
 L'Ongle de l'inconnu by Paul Béra
 Les Fontaines du ciel by Maurice Limat
 Les Forçats de l'Antarctique by Karl-Herbert Scheer
 Les Pétrifiés d'Altaïr by Piet Legay
 Pas de berceau pour les Ushas by Jan de Fast
 Interférence by Daniel Piret
 La Mémoire du futur by Georges Murcie
 La Louve de Thar-Gha by Dan Dastier
 Les Cerveaux morts by Karl-Herbert Scheer
 L'Univers fêlé by Jean Mazarin
 Sanctuaire 1 by Peter Randa
 La Chaîne des Symbios by Max-André Rayjean
 Les Maîtres verts by Gabriel Jan
 Le Plan de clivage by Jan de Fast
 Combats sous les cratères by Karl-Herbert Scheer
 Odyssée galactique by Pierre Barbet
 Les Combattants de Serkos by André Caroff
 L'Ange aux ailes de lumière by Gilles Thomas
 Les Jeux de Nora et du hasard by Jan de Fast
 Le Secret des secrets by Robert Clauzel
 Opération soleil levant by Karl-Herbert Scheer
 La Porte des enfers by Jacques Hoven
 Le Navire-planète by Daniel Piret
 Obsession Terzium 13 by Dan Dastier
 Anastasis by Peter Randa
 Véga IV by Piet Legay
 Le Barrage bleu by Clark Darlton and Karl-Herbert Scheer
 L'Hypothèse tétracérat by Doris Le May and Jean-Louis Le May
 Les Séquestrés de Kappa by Dan Dastier
 Reviens, Quémalta by Gabriel Jan
 Là-bas by Georges Murcie
 Génération Alpha by Max-André Rayjean
 Pouvoirs illimités by Karl-Herbert Scheer
 L'Épaisse fourrure des quadricornes by Doris Le May and Jean-Louis Le May
 Les Pléïades d'Artani by Peter Randa
 Le Soleil des Arians by Dan Dastier
 La Cloche de brume by Maurice Limat
 Le Piège de l'oubli by Jan de Fast
 Les Passagers du temps by Piet Legay

1979 
 Hors contrôle by Paul-Jean Hérault
 Les Maîtres de la matière by Max-André Rayjean
 Les Roches aux cent visages by Frank Dartal
 N'approchez pas by Karl-Herbert Scheer
 Le Fils de l'étoile by Jan de Fast
 Ceux d'ailleurs by Paul Béra
 Aux confins de l'empire Viédi by Jan de Fast
 Libérez l'homme ! by Jean Mazarin
 Tout va très bien, Madame la machine by F. Richard-Bessière
 Mission sur Mira by Jean-Pierre Garen
 Facultés inconnues by Karl-Herbert Scheer
 Impalpable Vénus by Gabriel Jan
 L'Ordre établi by Christopher Stork
 Comme un orgue d'enfer... by Robert Clauzel
 Les Androïdes meurent aussi by Dan Dastier
 L'Île brûlée by Gilles Thomas
 L'Exilé de l'infini by Piet Legay
 Le Désert des décharnés by Clark Darlton and Karl-Herbert Scheer
 Dô, coeur de soleil by Maurice Limat
 Palowstown by Jean-Christian Bergman
 L'Ombre dans la vallée by Jean-Louis Le May
 La Peste sauvage by Peter Randa
 Triplix by Jacques Hoven
 Le Règne du serpent by Frank Dartal
 Le Talef d'Alkoria by Dan Dastier
 L'Homme Alphoméga by Gabriel Jan
 Projet phoenix by Piet Legay
 Plus belle sera l'aurore by Jan de Fast
 Les Bagnards d'Alboral by Peter Randa
 Le Virus mystérieux by Karl-Herbert Scheer
 Les Singes d'Ulgor by Max-André Rayjean
 Enjeu : le Monde by Christopher Stork
 La Cité où le soleil n'entrait jamais by Jan de Fast
 D'un lieu lointain nommé Soltrois by Gilles Thomas
 Marée noire sur Altéa by Paul Béra
 Les Roues de feu by Karl-Herbert Scheer
 Les Ilotes d'en-bas by Peter Randa
 Trafic stellaire by Pierre Barbet
 37 minutes pour survivre by Paul-Jean Hérault
 Le Viaduc perdu by Jean-Louis Le May
 Facteur vie by Gilles Morris
 Sous le signe de la Grande Ourse by Karl-Herbert Scheer
 Branle-bas d'invasion by Peter Randa
 Dormir ? Rêver peut-être by Christopher Stork
 Aux quatre vents de l'univers by Frank Dartal
 Les Cités d'Apocalypse by Jean Mazarin
 Hiéroush, la planète promise by Jimmy Guieu
 Le Mutant d'Hiroshima by Karl-Herbert Scheer
 Naïa de Zomkaa by Dan Dastier
 Un passe-temps by Kurt Steiner
 Les Îles de la Lune by Michel Jeury
 La Flamme des cités perdues by Robert Clauzel
 N'Ooma by Daniel Piret
 Offensive Minotaure by Karl-Herbert Scheer
 La Jungle de pierre by Gilles Thomas
 Les Sphères attaquent by André Caroff
 Oasis de l'espace by Pierre Barbet
 Homme, sweet homme by Jean-Christian Bergman
 Les Lois de l'Orga by Adam Saint-Moore
 Safari pour un virus by Jean-Louis Le May
 Et les hommes voulurent mourir by Dan Dastier
 Bactéries 3000 by André Caroff
 Venu de l'infini by Peter Randa
 Le Verbe et la pensée by Jean-Louis Le May
 ...Ou que la vie renaisse by Gilles Morris
 Achetez Dieu ! by Christopher Stork

1980s

1980 
 Le Maître des cerveaux by Piet Legay
 Rod, combattant du futur by André Caroff
 Une autre éternité by Dan Dastier
 Les Quatre vents de l'éternité by F. Richard-Bessière
 Les Manipulateurs by Paul Béra
 Opération Okal by Clark Darlton and Karl-Herbert Scheer
 L'Ultimatum des treize jours by Jan de Fast
 Robinson du Cosmos by Jacques Hoven
 Tétras by Georges Murcie
 Virgules téléguidées by Pierre Suragne
 Moi, le feu by Maurice Limat
 Planète des Anges by Gabriel Jan
 Escale à Hango by Peter Randa
 Rod, menace sur Oxima by André Caroff
 Transfert Psi ! by Piet Legay
 L'Alizé Pargélide by Jean-Louis Le May
 La Terre est une légende by Frank Dartal
 Greffe-moi l'amour ! by Jean Mazarin
 Techniques de survie by Gilles Morris
 Les Jours de la montagne bleue by Adam Saint-Moore
 La Horde infâme by Paul Béra
 La Clé du Mandala by Jimmy Guieu
 Strontium 90 by Daniel Piret
 Dingue de planète by Gabriel Jan
 Les Sphères de Penta by Dan Dastier
 Terra-Park by Christopher Stork
 3087 by Adam Saint-Moore
 Untel, sa vie, son oeuvre by Gilles Morris
 Heyoka Wakan by Jean-Louis Le May
 Demandez le programme ! by Yann Menez
 Horlemonde by Gilles Thomas
 Les Écumeurs du silence by Michel Jeury
 Apocalypse snow by Jean-Christian Bergman
 Périple galactique by Pierre Barbet
 Contre-offensive Copernicus by Karl-Herbert Scheer
 Les Intemporels by Dan Dastier
 La Compagnie des Glaces by G.-J. Arnaud
 Chez Temporel by Louis Thirion
 Dérapages by Pierre Suragne
 Le Zénith... et après ? by Maurice Limat
 L'Usage de l'ascenseur est interdit aux enfants de moins de quatorze ans non accompagnés by Christopher Stork
 Les Malvivants by Gilles Morris
 Le Sombre éclat by Michel Jeury
 Groupe Géo by Max-André Rayjean
 Chak de Palar by Paul-Jean Hérault
 Civilisations galactiques-Providence by Frank Dartal
 Vive les surhommes ! by Jean Mazarin
 L'Homme aux deux visages by Clark Darlton and Karl-Herbert Scheer
 Nous irons à Kalponéa by Paul Béra
 Ballade pour un glandu by Yann Menez
 Le Défi génétique by Piet Legay
 La Vie en doses by Gilles Morris
 La Porte des serpents by Gilles Thomas
 La Mémoire de l'archipel by Adam Saint-Moore
 Deux souris pour un Concorde by Jean-Louis Le May
 Centre d'Intendance Godapol by Karl-Herbert Scheer
 Stade zéro by Dan Dastier
 La Dernière bataille de l'espace by Jan de Fast
 Survivance by Budy Matieson
 Rêves en synthèse by Gabriel Jan
 Les Vivants, les morts et les autres by Gilles Morris
 Programmation impossible by Karl-Herbert Scheer
 Les Dieux oubliés by Clark Darlton and Karl-Herbert Scheer
 Il y a un temps fou... by Christopher Stork
 L'Ultime test by Piet Legay
 Rod, patrouille de l'espace by André Caroff
 Le Maréchal rebelle by Pierre Barbet
 Q.I. by Paul Béra
 Intendance martienne Alpha VI by Karl-Herbert Scheer
 Vecteur Dieu by Gilles Morris
 Le Proscrit de Delta by Maurice Limat
 Quand la machine fait "boum" by F. Richard-Bessière
 Soucoupes violentes by Gilles Morris
 Le Seigneur de l'histoire by Michel Jeury
 Rod, Vacuum 02 by André Caroff
 Mission secrète "œil géant" by Karl-Herbert Scheer
 L'Aventure akonide by Clark Darlton and Karl-Herbert Scheer

1981 
 Le Sanctuaire des Glaces by G.-J. Arnaud
 L'Étrange maléfice by Piet Legay
 La Fresque by Paul-Jean Hérault
 Demain les rats by Christopher Stork
 Tamkan le paladin by Gabriel Jan
 Le Dieu endormi by Karl-Herbert Scheer
 Mannes éphémères by Clark Darlton and Karl-Herbert Scheer
 La Guerre des Lovies by Gilles Morris
 La Métamorphose des Shaftes by Dan Dastier
 La Légende future by Maurice Limat
 Obsession temporelle by Piet Legay
 La Vingt-sixième réincarnation by Adam Saint-Moore
 Le Test de l'aigle rouge by Karl-Herbert Scheer
 Le Secret des pierres radieuses by Jan de Fast
 Les Fusils d'Ekaistos by Philippe Randa
 Les Derniers anges by Christopher Stork
 Déchéa by Max-André Rayjean
 Les Plasmoïdes au pouvoir ? by Gilles Morris
 Le Peuple des Glaces by G.-J. Arnaud
 Étoile sur Mentha by Gabriel Jan
 Alerte à l'hypnose by Karl-Herbert Scheer
 Changez de bocal by Paul Béra
 Capitaine Pluton by Jean-Pierre Garen
 Le Mystère Varga by Piet Legay
 La Sainte Espagne programmée by Michel Jeury
 Une morsure de feu by Maurice Limat
  by Clark Darlton and Karl-Herbert Scheer
 Coefficient de sécurité : trois by Karl-Herbert Scheer
 L'Expérience du grand cataclysme by Philippe Randa
 Les Volcans de Mars by Jean-Louis Le May
 Échec aux Ro'has by Piet Legay
  by Gabriel Jan
 Un monde impossible by Gilles Morris
 Cités des Astéroïdes by Pierre Barbet
 S.O.S. Sibérie by Karl-Herbert Scheer
 Les Dieux maudits d'Alphéa by Dan Dastier
 Vatican 2000 by Christopher Stork
 Le Réveil des dieux by Philippe Randa
 Notre chair disparue by Gilles Morris
 Les Chasseurs des Glaces by G.-J. Arnaud
 La Traque d'été by Adam Saint-Moore
 Jaïral by Max-André Rayjean
 Le Palais du roi Phédon by Philippe Randa
 La Révolte des grands cerveaux by Karl-Herbert Scheer
 Pas de passeport pour Anésia by Jan de Fast
 La Nuit solaire by Maurice Limat
 Les Non-humains by Jacques Hoven
 Opération Dernière Chance by Clark Darlton and Karl-Herbert Scheer
 La Révolte des boudragues by Jean-Louis Le May
 ...ou que la mort triomphe ! by Gilles Morris
 Angel félina by Joël Houssin
 Mais l'espace... mais le temps... by Daniel Walther
 Avant-poste by Jean Mazarin
 Les Hommes-processeurs by Michel Jeury
 Le Bon Larron by Christopher Stork
 Titcht by Christian Mantey
 Les Petites femmes vertes by Christopher Stork
 Planète-Suicide by Gilles Morris
 L'Enfant de Xéna by Dan Dastier
 Le Troubadour de minuit by Maurice Limat
 Le Monde noir by Max-André Rayjean
 Les Psychos de Logir by Pierre Barbet
 Rencontres extragalactiques by Clark Darlton and Karl-Herbert Scheer
 Mission sur terre by Philippe Randa
 Sheena by Gabriel Jan
 En une éternité ... by Jean Mazarin
 L'Enfant des glaces by G.-J. Arnaud
 Un autre monde by André Caroff
 Le Pronostiqueur by Joël Houssin
 Lacunes dans l'espace by Jean-Louis Le May
 La Femme invisible by Christopher Stork
 Une secte comme beaucoup d'autres by Gilles Morris
 Le Règne d'Astakla by Dan Dastier
 Il fera si bon mourir ... by Jan de Fast
 Au nom de l'espèce by Piet Legay
 Sloma de l'Abianta by Daniel Piret
 N'aboyez pas trop fort, Mr. Brenton by F. Richard-Bessière

1982 
 L'Enjeu lunaire by Karl-Herbert Scheer
 Les Otages des Glaces by G.-J. Arnaud
 Captif du temps by André Caroff
 Les Renégats d'Ixa by Maurice Limat
 Les Envoyés de Mega by Daniel Piret
 Message de Bâl 188 by Frank Dartal
 Fallait-il tuer Dieu ? by Gilles Morris
 Le Gnome halluciné by G.-J. Arnaud
 Nadar by Gabriel Jan
 Baroud sur Bolkar by Philippe Randa
 Sept soleils dans la Licorne by Jean-Louis Le May
 Le Champion des mondes by Joël Houssin
 Le Cocon-Psi by Karl-Herbert Scheer
 La Mort de Mecanica by Clark Darlton and Karl-Herbert Scheer
 Examen de passage by Gilles Morris
 L'An II de la mafia by Christopher Stork
 Cités interstellaires by Pierre Barbet
 Le Livre de Swa by Daniel Walther
 La Planète du jugement by Michel Jeury
 Le Secret d'Irgoun by Dan Dastier
 Shea by Budy Matieson
 Les Survivants de l'Au-delà by F. Richard-Bessière
 Cosmodrame by Gilles Morris
 Hypothèse "gamma" by Piet Legay
 La Compagnie de la Banquise by G.-J. Arnaud
 Prométhée by Daniel Piret
 Tu vivras, Céréluna by Gabriel Jan
 Haute-Ville by Jean Mazarin
 Coup dur sur Deneb by Maurice Limat
 Blue by Joël Houssin
 L'Ère des Bionites by Dan Dastier
 La Planète Noire de Lothar by Philippe Randa
 Métal en fusion by André Caroff
 L'Oiseau de Mars by Karl-Herbert Scheer
 Le Captif du futur by Clark Darlton and Karl-Herbert Scheer
 Un monde si noir by Piet Legay
 La Vie, la mort confondues... by Gilles Morris
 Survivants de l'apocalypse by Pierre Barbet
 Le Voyage de Baktur by Gabriel Jan
 Tout le pouvoir aux étoiles by Christopher Stork
 Les Conjurés de Shargol by Philippe Randa
 La Bataille de Panotol by Clark Darlton and Karl-Herbert Scheer
 Le Réseau de Patagonie by G.-J. Arnaud
 Le Destin de Swa by Daniel Walther
 L'Hérésiarque by Adam Saint-Moore
 Masques de Clown by Joël Houssin
 Terreur psy by André Caroff
 Ald'haï by Jean-Louis Le May
 Les Glaces du temps by Frank Dartal
 Les Esclaves de Xicor by Maurice Limat
 Un pour tous... tous pourris ! by Gilles Morris
 L'Horrible découverte du Dr Coffin by Robert Clauzel
 Le Dernier des Zwors by Jean-Pierre Garen
 Elle s'appelait Loan by Piet Legay
 L'Empereur d'Éridan by Pierre Barbet
 Arbitrage martien by Karl-Herbert Scheer
 Nausicaa by Jean Mazarin
 La Machine maîtresse by Christopher Stork
 Folle meffa by Philippe Randa
 Une odeur de sainteté by Gilles Morris
 Le Piège des sables by André Caroff
 Livradoch le Fou by Jean-Louis Le May
 L'Ordre des vigiles by Max-André Rayjean
 Les Astres noirs by Clark Darlton and Karl-Herbert Scheer
 Une peau si... bleue ! by Piet Legay
 Les Voiliers du rail by G.-J. Arnaud
 Goer-le-renard by Michel Jeury
 Le Répertoire des époques de cette galaxie et de quelques autres by Louis Thirion
 Les Mangeurs de murailles by Serge Brussolo
 Le Mécaniquosmos by Maurice Limat
 Lilith by Joël Houssin
 Dis, qu'as-tu fait, toi que voilà ... by Christopher Stork
 Les Écologistes de combat by Philippe Randa
 ... Et le Paradis en plus ! by Gilles Morris
 Les Héritiers d'Antinéa by Dan Dastier
 A l'image du dragon by Serge Brussolo
 Les Cages de Beltem by Gilles Thomas
 La Bataille des dieux by J. Stuntman

1983 
 L'Effet Halstead by Christian Mantey
 Planeta non grata by Michel Honaker
 Brigade de mort by Gabriel Jan
 Perpetuum... by Piet Legay
 Et un temps pour mourir by Frank Dartal
 Les Fous du soleil by G.-J. Arnaud
 Les Charognards de S'nien by Pierre Barbet
 Génération Clash by Gilles Morris
 La 666e planète by Daniel Piret
 La Légende de Swa by Daniel Walther
 L'Oiseau dans le ciment by André Caroff
 Expérimentation Alpha by Louis Thirion
 Les Jardins de Xantha by Gabriel Jan
 Les Tours divines by Michel Jeury
 Network-Cancer by G.-J. Arnaud
 La Frontière indécise by Gilles Morris
 L'Ombre du tueur by Paul Béra
 Les Presque dieux by Maurice Limat
 Génie génétique by Jean-Pierre Garen
 Anticorps 107 by Piet Legay
 Médiation protoplasmique by Clark Darlton and Karl-Herbert Scheer
 Avant les déluges by F. Richard-Bessière
 Le Chasseur by Joël Houssin
 La Grande prêtresse de Yashtar by Gabriel Jan
 La Quatrième personne du pluriel by Christopher Stork
 Les Prophètes de l'apocalypse by Jean Mazarin
 Wildlife connection by Christian Mantey
 Opération surprise by Clark Darlton and Karl-Herbert Scheer
 Trop pour un seul homme by Gilles Morris
 L'Article de la mort by Christopher Stork
 Ce cœur dans la glace... by Piet Legay
 Station-Fantôme by G.-J. Arnaud
 Le Puzzle de chair by Serge Brussolo
 Dérive sur Kimelunga by Jean-Louis Le May
 Embuscade sur Ornella by Daniel Walther
 Après les déluges by F. Richard-Bessière
 La Dernière syllabe du temps by Christopher Stork
 Intervention Flash by Gilles Morris
 Comme un vol de chimères by Maurice Limat
 Aléas à travers le temps by Philippe Randa
 Les Fils de Prométhée by Daniel Piret
 Prisonnier du plasma by Clark Darlton and Karl-Herbert Scheer
 City by Joël Houssin
 Les Cendres de la nuit by Robert Clauzel
 Élimination by André Caroff
 Mon pote, le Martien... by Philippe Randa
 Quand le temps soufflera by Michel Jeury
 Shan-Aya by Dan Dastier
 Dimension quatre ! (La loi du temps) by Piet Legay
 Un peu... beaucoup... à la folie by Christopher Stork
 Un peu de vin d'antan by Jean-Louis Le May
 Les Semeurs d'abîmes by Serge Brussolo 
 Ordinator-Labyrinthus by André Caroff
 Évolution Crash by Gilles Morris
 Le Grand oiseau des galaxies by Maurice Limat
 Un bonheur qui dérape by Jean Mazarin
 Les Hommes-Jonas by G.-J. Arnaud
 Simulations by André Caroff
 Territoire de fièvre by Serge Brussolo
 Game Over by Joël Houssin
 Alpha-Park by Max-André Rayjean
 Rome doit être détruite by Pierre Barbet
 Le Monde-aux-Cent-Soleils by Clark Darlton and Karl-Herbert Scheer
 Le XXIe siècle n'aura pas lieu by Christopher Stork
 Les Lutteurs immobiles by Serge Brussolo
 Secteur Diable by Gilles Morris
 La Cité de l'éternelle nuit by Robert Clauzel
 Vers l'âge d'or by Michel Jeury
 À la découverte du Graal by F. Richard-Bessière
 Apollo XXV by Daniel Walther
 Mais n'anticipons pas... by Christopher Stork
 La Démone de Karastan by Philippe Randa
 Voyeur by Joël Houssin
 L'Œil éCarlate by Maurice Limat
 Terminus Amertume by G.-J. Arnaud
 Un jeu parmi tant d'autres by Gabriel Jan
 Kamikazement vôtres by Gilles Morris

1984 
 L'Histoire détournée by Jean Mazarin
 Les Brûleurs de banquise by G.-J. Arnaud
 Reflets d'entre-temps by Jean-Louis Le May
 Les Fils du serpent by Jimmy Guieu
 Pièces détachées by Christopher Stork
 Les Bêtes enracinées by Serge Brussolo
 Le Planétoïde hanté by Clark Darlton and Karl-Herbert Scheer
 Génération Satan by Piet Legay
 La Parole by Daniel Piret
 Les Vikings de Sirius by Maurice Limat
 No man's land by Christian Mantey
 Cal de Ter by Paul-Jean Hérault
 Les Métamorphes by Gilles Morris
 Ticket aller-retour pour l'hyperspace by Louis Thirion
 Les Colons d'Eridan by Pierre Barbet
 On ne meurt pas sous le ciel rouge by Gabriel Jan
 Le Gouffre aux garous by G.-J. Arnaud
 Survivre ensemble by Gilles Morris
 L'Emprise du cristal by Jean-Pierre Garen
 Les Goulags mous by Jacques Mondoloni
 Ce qui mordait le ciel… by Serge Brussolo
 L'Homme de lumière by Maurice Limat
 Virus Amok by Christopher Stork
 Les Maîtres de l'horreur by F. Richard-Bessière
 Demain matin, au chant du tueur ! by Michel Pagel
 L'Autre race... by Piet Legay
 L'Âge de Lumière by Max-André Rayjean
 Le Combat des Cent-Soleils by Clark Darlton and Karl-Herbert Scheer
 Carthage sera détruite by Pierre Barbet
 Le passé dépassé by Christopher Stork
 Les Ombres de la Mégapole by Adam Saint-Moore
 Un avenir sur commande by Gilles Morris
 Les Survivants de la mer Morte by Robert Clauzel
 Le Dirigeable sacrilège by G.-J. Arnaud
 Soupçons sur Hydra by Jean-Pierre Andrevon
 La Taverne de l'espoir by Michel Pagel
 Psy-connection by Piet Legay
 Les Démoniaques de Kallioh by Hugues Douriaux
 Les Bannières de Persh by Jean-Pierre Fontana and Alain Paris
 Deux pas dans le soleil by André Caroff
 Patrouilles by Jean Mazarin
 L'Esprit de Vénus by Karl-Herbert Scheer
 Pieuvres by Christopher Stork
 Vieillesse délinquante by Gilles Morris
 L'Élixir pourpre by Maurice Limat
 Crache-Béton by Serge Brussolo
 L'Anaphase du Diable by Michel Jeury
 La Pugnace révolution de Phagor by Daniel Walther
 Le Calumet de l'oncle Chok by Jean-Louis Le May
 L'Envers vaut l'endroit by Christopher Stork
 Le Viêt-nam au futur simple by Michel Pagel
 Liensun by G.-J. Arnaud
 L'Autre côté du vide by Gilles Morris
 Dernier étage avant la frontière by Jean-Pierre Fontana and Alain Paris
 Nord by Thierry Lassalle
 Menaces sur les mutants by Clark Darlton and Karl-Herbert Scheer
 Illa et son étoile by Jean-Louis Le May
 Ordinator-Macchabées by André Caroff
 Le Celte Noir by Michaël Clifden
 Le Flambeau de l'Univers by Max-André Rayjean
 Les Fœtus d'acier by Serge Brussolo
 Le Dernier pilote by Paul-Jean Hérault
 Incarnation illégale by Karl-Herbert Scheer
 Les Éboueurs de la vie éternelle by G.-J. Arnaud
 La Guerre de la lumière by Gabriel Jan
 Les Décervelés by Piet Legay
 La Nuit des insectes by Th. Cryde
 Offensive minérale by Gilles Morris
 L'Ordre des ordres by Jean-Pierre Garen
 Lorsque R'Saanz parut by Louis Thirion
 Terre des femmes by Christopher Stork
 Sarkô des grandes zunes by Jean-Pierre Fontana and Alain Paris
 Ordinator-Phantastikos by André Caroff
 Carthage en Amérique by Jacques Mondoloni
 À moins d'un miracle... by Gilles Morris
 Les Idoles du lynx by Maurice Limat
 Les Pierres de la Mort by F. Richard-Bessière

1985 
 Eldorado stellaire by Pierre Barbet
 Galactic paranoïa by Louis Thirion
 L'Hydre acéphale by Maurice Limat
 La Troisième puissance by Gabriel Jan
 Les Trains-cimetières by G.-J. Arnaud
 Galax-western by Hugues Douriaux
 Le Mirage de la montagne chantante by Clark Darlton and Karl-Herbert Scheer
 Camarade Yankee ! by Philippe Randa
 Paradis zéro by Pierre Pelot
 Osmose by Th. Cryde
 Ehecatl, seigneur le vent by Jean-Louis Le May
 L'Âge à rebours by Jean Mazarin
 Le Syndrome Karelmann by Jean-Pierre Fontana and Alain Paris
 Rhino by Dominique Douay
 Ordinator-Érotikos by André Caroff
 Le Premier hybride by Jean-Pierre Andrevon
 Les Psychomutants by Gilles Morris
 Les Fils de Lien Rag by G.-J. Arnaud
 Le Dernier paradis by Michel Jeury
 Ambulance cannibale non identifiée by Serge Brussolo
 Le Rêve du papillon chinois by Christopher Stork
 Les Clans de l'étang vert by Adam Saint-Moore
 Le Bruit des autres by Pierre Pelot
 Silence... on meurt ! by F. Richard-Bessière
 Cités biotiques by Pierre Barbet
 Les Contrebandiers du futur by Philippe Randa
 Viol génétique by Piet Legay
 Rouge est la chute du soleil by Maurice Limat
 Made in Mars by Christopher Stork
 Les Survivants du paradis by Michel Jeury
 Le Semeur d'ombres by Michel Honaker
 Ordinator-Criminalis by André Caroff
 Androïdes en série by Karl-Herbert Scheer
 Le Miroir du passé by Gilbert Picard
 La Pire espèce by Gilles Morris
 Le Rire du lance-flammes by Serge Brussolo
 Les Lunatiques by Christopher Stork
 Téléclones by Pierre Barbet
 Le Veilleur à la lisière du monde by Daniel Walther
 Poupée tueuse by Jean Mazarin
 La Cité du vent damné by Maurice Limat
 Voyageuse Yeuse by G.-J. Arnaud
 Billevesées et calembredaines by Christopher Stork
 À quoi bon ressusciter ? by Gilbert Picard
 Le Château des Vents infernaux by Hugues Douriaux
 Les Hommes-vecteurs by Michaël Clifden
 L'Inconnue de Ryg by Jean-Pierre Garen
 La Marée d'or by Michel Jeury
 La Valeur de la vie by Clark Darlton and Karl-Herbert Scheer
 Ordinator-Ocularis by André Caroff
 Ceux de la Montagne-de-Fer by Maurice Limat
 Le Temple du dieu Mazon by Jean-Pierre Fontana and Alain Paris
 Rempart des naufrageurs by Serge Brussolo
 Les Acteurs programmés by Max-André Rayjean
 Putsch galactique by Pierre Barbet
 Lumière d'abîme by Michel Honaker
 L'Ange du désert by Michel Pagel
 Ordinator-craignos by André Caroff
 L'Ampoule de cendres by G.-J. Arnaud
 Roulette russe by Daridjana
 Sur qui veillent les Achachilas by Jean-Louis Le May
 La Marque des Antarcidès by Alain Paris
 Pour une dent, toute la gueule by Gilles Morris
 Le Volcan des sirènes by Gilbert Picard
 Cadavres à tout faire by F. Richard-Bessière
 Babel bluff by Christopher Stork
 Les Visiteurs du passé by Karl-Herbert Scheer
 Abattoir-Opéra by Serge Brussolo
 La Semaine carnivore by Th. Cryde
 Feu sur tout ce qui bouge ! by Gilles Morris
 L'Enfant de l'espace by Christopher Stork
 Ordinator-Rapidos by André Caroff
 Le Clan du brouillard by Jean-Pierre Fontana and Alain Paris
 Solstice de fer by Francis Berthelot
 Wân, l'iconoclaste by Maurice Limat
 La Mémoire totale by Claude Ecken
 Retour en avant by Gilles Morris

1986 
 Naufrage sur une chaise électrique by Serge Brussolo
 Quand souvenirs revenir, nous souffrir et mourir by Jean-Michel Dagory
 Les Passagers du mirage by Pierre Pelot
 La Piste du sud by Thierry Lassalle
 P.L.U.M. 66-50 by Hugues Douriaux
 Sahra by Jean-Louis Le May
 Le Fléau de la galaxie by Clark Darlton and Karl-Herbert Scheer
 Sun company by G.-J. Arnaud
 Demi-portion by Christopher Stork
 Rowena by Michel Pagel
 Soldat-chien by Alain Paris
 La Guerre des loisirs by Max-André Rayjean
 Le Diable soit avec nous ! by Philippe Randa
 Le Bricolo by Paul-Jean Hérault
 Équinoxe de cendre by Francis Berthelot
 La Fleur pourpre by Jean-Pierre Garen
 Glaciation nucléaire by Pierre Barbet
 Le Chant du Vorkul by Michel Honaker
 Que l'éternité soit avec vous ! by Louis Thirion
 L'Heure perdue by Guy Charmasson
 Nitrabyl la ténébreuse by Karl-Herbert Scheer
 Un pied sur Terre by Gilles Morris
 Enfer vertical en approche rapide by Serge Brussolo
 Poupée cassée by Jean Mazarin
 Ils étaient une fois... by Christopher Stork
 Les Sibériens by G.-J. Arnaud
 Le Feu du Vahad'Har by Gabriel Jan
 La Jaune by Jean-Pierre Fontana
 Les Horreurs de la paix by Gilles Morris
 Transfert by Gérard Delteil
 O Tuha'd et les chasseurs by Jean-Louis Le May
 Le Temps des rats by Louis Thirion
 Ashermayam by Alain Paris
 La Ville d'acier by Michel Pagel
 La Saga d'Arne Marsson by Pierre Bameul
 Psys contre psys by Christopher Stork
 Le Clochard ferroviaire by G.-J. Arnaud
 La Barrière du crâne by Gilles Morris
 Métamorphosa by Philippe Randa
 Fou dans la tête de Nazi Jones... by Pierre Pelot
 La Colère des ténèbres by Serge Brussolo
 Khéoba-la-maudite by Maurice Limat
 Les Vautours by Joël Houssin
 Citéléem by Max-André Rayjean
 Les Androïdes du désert by Hugues Douriaux
 Les Conquérants immobiles by Pierre Pelot
 Opération Bacchus by Jean-Pierre Garen
 Les Combattants des abysses by Gilbert Picard
 Eridan VII by Frank Dartal
 Le Miroir de Molkex by Clark Darlton and Karl-Herbert Scheer
 Le Sphinx des nuages by Maurice Limat
 Danger, parking miné ! by Serge Brussolo
 De purs esprits... by Christopher Stork
 Les Wagons-mémoires by G.-J. Arnaud
 Objectif : surhomme by Gilles Morris
 Tragédie musicale by Hugues Douriaux
 "Reich" by Alain Paris
 En direct d'ailleurs by Gilles Morris
 Mémoires d'un épouvantail blessé au combat by Pierre Pelot
 La Croisade des assassins by Pierre Barbet
 Les Hommes-lézards by Jean-Pierre Fontana and Alain Paris
 Don Quichotte II by Christopher Stork
 Le Rêve et l'assassin by Sylviane Corgiat and Bruno Lecigne
 Rébellion sur Euhja by Clark Darlton and Karl-Herbert Scheer
 La Piste des écorchés by Gilles Morris
 Le Choix des destins by Pierre Bameul
 Mausolée pour une locomotive by G.-J. Arnaud
 Catacombes by Serge Brussolo
 Le Gladiateur de Vénusia by Jean-Pierre Garen
 Le Fou by Michel Pagel
 Cacophonie du nouveau monde by Gabriel Jan
 Observation du virus en temps de paix by Pierre Pelot
 Le Rêve du Vorkul by Michel Honaker
 Et la pluie tomba sur Mars by Maurice Limat
 L'Agonie des hommes by Gilles Morris
 Le Raid infernal by Paul-Jean Hérault
 L'Endroit bleu by Th. Cryde
 Contretemps by Christopher Stork
 L'Ombre des Antarcidès by Alain Paris
 Dans le ventre d'une légende by G.-J. Arnaud
 La Métamorphose du Molkex by Clark Darlton and Karl-Herbert Scheer
 Temps changeants by Pierre Barbet
 Le Programme troisième guerre mondiale by Sylviane Corgiat and Bruno Lecigne
 Le Viol du dieu Ptah by Phil Laramie
 Ultime solution... by Piet Legay

1987 
 Accident temporel by Louis Thirion
 Le Monde d'après by Hugues Douriaux
 Le Dragon de Wilk by Jean-Pierre Garen
 Par le sabre des Zinjas by Roger Facon
 Les Cavaliers dorés by Michel Pagel
 U.S. go home... go, go ! by Philippe Randa
 La Cité des Hommes-de-Fer by Jean-Pierre Fontana and Alain Paris
 Les Échafaudages d'épouvante by G.-J. Arnaud
 Docteur squelette by Serge Brussolo
 Défense spatiale by Pierre Barbet
 Les Naufragés du 14-18 by Clark Darlton and Karl-Herbert Scheer
 Mortel contact by Piet Legay
 L'Univers en pièce by Claude Ecken
 Le Lit à baldaquin by Christopher Stork
 Building by Michel Honaker
 Cocons by Philippe Guy
 La Folle ruée des Akantor by Phil Laramie
 Le Serpent de rubis by Maurice Limat
 L'Araignée by Sylviane Corgiat and Bruno Lecigne
 Appelez-moi Einstein ! by Gilles Morris
 Les Idées solubles by Jacques Mondoloni
 Les Êtres vagues by Gilles Morris
 Les Errants by Hugues Douriaux
 Les Guerrières de Lesban by Jean-Pierre Garen
 Baroud pour le genre humain by Philippe Randa
 EMO by Bruno Lecigne
 Le Réveil de la forteresse by Karl-Herbert Scheer
 Les Ambulances du rêve by Richard Canal
 Opération "serrures carnivores" by Serge Brussolo
 Le Labyrinthe d'Eysal by Clark Darlton and Karl-Herbert Scheer
 Les Portes de l'enfer by Piet Legay
 La Famille by Paul-Jean Hérault
 Les Montagnes affamées by G.-J. Arnaud
 Le Rideau de glace by Alain Billy
 Je souffre pour vous... by Christopher Stork
 L'Univers-ombre by Michel Jeury
 Lointaine étoile by Maurice Limat
 La Longue errance by Gilles Morris
 Captifs de Corvus by Pierre Barbet
 Les Guerriers by Hugues Douriaux
 Le Sceau des Antarcidès by Alain Paris
 Les Sirènes d'Almadia by Philippe Randa
 La Nuit du venin by Serge Brussolo
 La Prodigieuse agonie by G.-J. Arnaud
 Alabama. Un. Neuf. Neuf. Six. by Pierre Pelot
 La Légende étoilée by Richard Canal
 Le Souffle de cristal by Sylviane Corgiat and Bruno Lecigne
 Une si jolie petite planète by Christopher Stork
 Un temps pour la guerre by Frank Dartal
 Le Dernier témoin by Piet Legay
 Le Sixième symbiote by Dan Dastier
 Un reich de 1000 ans ! by Pierre Barbet
 Le Chariot de Thalia by Jean-Pierre Garen
 Sergent-pilote Gurvan by Paul-Jean Hérault
 Soleil pourpre, soleil noir by Michel Pagel
 Le Commencement de la fin by Gilles Morris
 Sécession bis by Pierre Pelot
 Les Squales de la cité engloutie by Phil Laramie
 L'Hérésie magicienne by Jean-Louis Le May
 La Croix de flamme by Maurice Limat
 Le Trillionnaire by Christopher Stork
 Destination Atlantide by Karl-Herbert Scheer
 On m'appelait Lien Rag by G.-J. Arnaud
 Les Animaux funèbres by Serge Brussolo
 Les Olympiades truquées by Joëlle Wintrebert
 Les Gladiateurs de Nephers by Hugues Douriaux
 La Haine du Vorkul by Michel Honaker
 Les Vitrines du ciel by Jacques Mondoloni 
 Le Fond de l'abîme by Gilles Morris
 Le Piège de glace by Clark Darlton and Karl-Herbert Scheer
 Cette vérité qui tue by Piet Legay
 Offensive du virus sous le champ de bataille by Pierre Pelot
 Train spécial pénitentiaire 34 by G.-J. Arnaud
 Les Voix grises du monde gris by Richard Canal
 La Septième griffe de Togor by Gérard Delteil
 Gurvan : les premières victoires by Paul-Jean Hérault
 Le Serpent d'angoisse by Roland C. Wagner
 Objectif : Mars 2005 by Pierre Barbet
 Le Dernier soleil by Max-André Rayjean
 Les Enfants du soleil by Christopher Stork
 La Planète des femmes by Roger Facon
 Les Démons de la montagne by Jean-Pierre Garen
 Le Bout du tunnel by Gilles Morris
 Le Temple de chair by Jean-Claude Dunyach
 Vermine by Hugues Douriaux
 L'Ombre des gnomes by Serge Brussolo
 Terre ! Terre ! by Gilles Morris
 Les Hallucinés de la voie oblique by G.-J. Arnaud
 Hors-jeu by Gérard Delteil
 Les Élus de Tôh by Gabriel Jan
 Atoxa-des-abysses by Maurice Limat

1988 
 Soldat-chien 2 by Alain Paris
 Périls sur Mû by Philippe Randa
 Traqueur by Samuel Dharma
 Les Sauveteurs Sigans by Clark Darlton and Karl-Herbert Scheer
 Alter ego by Christopher Stork
 Tigre by Daniel Walther
 Aqualud ! by Piet Legay
 La Chasse by Hugues Douriaux
 Le Maître de Juvénia by Jean-Pierre Garen
 Le Temple d'Os by Jean-Claude Dunyach
 Le Masque d'écailles by Sylviane Corgiat and Bruno Lecigne
 L'Incroyable odyssée by Guy Charmasson
 Officier - pilote Gurvan by Paul-Jean Hérault
 L'Orchidée rouge de madame Shan by Alain Billy
 Un ange s'est pendu by Roland C. Wagner
 Le Voleur d'icebergs by Serge Brussolo
 Le Clone triste by Milan
 La Course contre la montre by Clark Darlton and Karl-Herbert Scheer
 Le Rire du Klone by Milan
 Le Loup by Hugues Douriaux
 Option zéro by Pierre Barbet
 Divine entreprise by Roger Facon
 L'Épopée du Draco by Frank Dartal
 Aux yeux la lune by Michel Jeury
 Bébé-miroir by Joëlle Wintrebert
 Survival by Piet Legay
 Le Mal d'Ibrator by Philippe Randa
 Le Tombeau du roi squelette by Serge Brussolo
 Pour une poignée d'Helix Pomatias by Michel Pagel
 Svastika by Alain Paris
 La Vengeance de l'Androïde by Jean-Pierre Garen
 L'Effondrement d'un empire by Clark Darlton and Karl-Herbert Scheer
 Kriegspiel by Dominique Goult & Jean-Marc Ligny
 Le Grand hurlement by Phil Laramie
 La Vengeance by Guy Charmasson
 Seigneur des runes by Alain Paris
 Maaga-la-Scythe by Alain Billy
 Nécromancies by Samuel Dharma
 Projet Nouvelle-Vénus by Claude J. Legrand
 La Mission by Guy Charmasson
 Sur l'épaule du grand dragon by Alain Paris
 L'Offensive de crétinisation by Clark Darlton and Karl-Herbert Scheer
 Le Monde au-delà des brumes by Hugues Douriaux
 Les Serviteurs de la force by Roger Facon and J.-M. Parent
 Réalité 2 by Louis Thirion
 Les Hérétiques du Vril by Alain Paris
 Thorn le guerrier by Hugues Douriaux
 Ronge by Yves Frémion
 L'Enfer des homosimiens by Piet Legay
 La Mémoire des pierres by Roland C. Wagner
 Les Hommes marqués by Gilles Thomas
 La Sylve sanguinaire by Clark Darlton and Karl-Herbert Scheer
 La Quête du Graal by Jean-Pierre Garen
 Les Mortels et les dieux by Hugues Douriaux
 Prisons intérieures by Roland C. Wagner
 Le Bagne des ténèbres by Laurent Genefort
 Le Dieu de lumière by Jean-Pierre Andrevon
 Le Diable à quatre by Michel Pagel
 Le Dieu du delta by Bertrand Passegué
 Les Futurs mystères de Paris by Roland C. Wagner
 Le Crépuscule du compagnon by François Rahier
 Dreamworld by Dominique Goult and Jean-Marc Ligny
 Les Croisés de Mara by G.-J. Arnaud

1989 
 ''Panique à la banque du sperme'' by [[Gérard Néry]]
 ''Le Dragon du roi squelette'' by [[Serge Brussolo]]
 ''Dernière chance : humanité'' by [[Piet Legay]]
 ''Le Chemin d'ombres'' by [[Samuel Dharma]]
 ''Onze bonzes de bronze'' by [[Max Anthony]]
 ''L'Autoroute sauvage'' by [[Gilles Thomas]]
 ''Piège sur Korz'' by [[Jean-Pierre Garen]]
 ''Les Semeurs de mirages'' by [[Jean-Marc Ligny]]
 ''Le Dieu de la guerre'' by [[Alain Paris]]
 ''Jhedin Ovoghemma'' by [[Yves Carl]] 
 ''Les Guerrières de Arastawar'' by [[Louis Thirion]]
 ''Les Monarques de Bi'' by [[G.-J. Arnaud]]
 ''Pâques sanglantes aux caraïbes'' by [[Gérard Néry]]
 ''Syndrome apocalypse'' by [[Hugues Douriaux]]
 ''Argyll'' by [[Bertrand Passegué]]
 ''Le Paysage déchiré'' by [[Roland C. Wagner]]
 ''Genesis II'' by [[Piet Legay]]
 ''Le Temps cyclothymique'' by [[Jean-Pierre Andrevon]]
 ''L'Art du rêve'' by [[Jean-Marc Ligny]]
 ''Des enfants très doués'' by [[Jean-Pierre Garen]]
 ''De silence et de feu'' by [[Claude Ecken]]
 ''Le Souffle de lune'' by [[Alain Billy]]
 ''Fantasmes en stock'' by [[Max Anthony]]
 ''La Croix des décastés'' by [[Gilles Thomas]]
 ''Sylvana'' by [[Michel Pagel]]
 ''Mort à l'encre de chine'' by [[Gérard Néry]]
 ''Shândoah !'' by [[Piet Legay]]
 ''Les Enfants du silence'' by [[Claude Ecken]]
 ''Le Septième cycle'' by [[Bertrand Passegué]]
 ''Brebis galeuses'' by [[André Ruellan|Kurt Steiner]]
 ''Enfer et purgatoire'' by [[Michel Honaker]]
 ''À la recherche de Faërie'' by [[Jean-Marc Ligny]]
 ''Un navire ancré dans le ciel'' by [[Roland C. Wagner]]
 ''Dernière tempête'' by [[Philippe Guy]]
 ''Yriel'' by [[Robert Alexandre]] 
 ''La Septième saison'' by [[Pierre Pelot]]
 ''Les Pierres de sang'' by [[Jean-Pierre Garen]]
 ''Égrégore'' by [[Piet Legay]]
 ''Cette chose qui vivait sur Véra'' by [[Louis Thirion]]
 ''La Mort marchait dans les rues'' by [[Roland C. Wagner]]
 ''Fleur'' by [[Patrick Lachèze]]
 ''Lazaret 3'' by [[G.-J. Arnaud]]
 ''Dal Refa'I'' by [[Alain Paris]]
 ''Labyrinthe de la nuit'' by [[Jean-Marc Ligny]]
 ''La Forteresse éternelle'' by [[Bertrand Passegué]]
 ''Top niveau'' by J.-C. Lamart
 ''Tchernobagne'' by [[Gérard Delteil]]
 ''La Mort en billes'' by [[Gilles Thomas]]
 ''Joal ban Kluane'' by [[Alain Paris]]
 ''Le Roi de fer'' by [[Jean-Pierre Garen]]
 ''Terminus l'Enfer'' by [[Gérard Néry]]
 ''L'Androïde livide de l'astéroïde morbide'' by [[Max Anthony]]
 ''Le Rire du clone'' by [[Piet Legay]]
 ''Le Rescapé de la Terre'' by [[Paul-Jean Hérault]]
 ''Sassar'' by [[Alain Paris]]
 ''Le Lévrier de Varik'' by [[Hugues Douriaux]]
 ''Hypnos et Psyché'' by [[Jean-Marc Ligny]]
 ''Le Grand hiver'' by [[Bertrand Passegué]] 
 ''La Planète Jaja'' by [[Daniel Walther]]
 ''Les Bâtisseurs du monde'' by [[Paul-Jean Hérault]]
 ''Bronx cérémonial'' by [[Michel Honaker]]
 ''Les Noyés du fleuve Amour'' by [[Gérard Néry]]
 ''Désirs cruels'' by [[Michel Pagel]]
 ''O Gamesh, prince des ténèbres'' by [[Piet Legay]]
 ''L'Autre Cécile'' by [[Claude Ecken]]
 ''Les Ratés'' by [[Gilles Thomas]]
 ''La Chute des dieux'' by [[Jean-Pierre Garen]]
 ''La Soie rouge de Xanta'' by [[Hugues Douriaux]]

1990s

1990 
<li value="1731"> ''Traqueur d'illusions'' by [[Jean-Marc Ligny]]
 ''Le Présent du fou'' by [[Pierre Pelot]]
 ''[[Les Psychopompes de Klash]]'' by [[Roland C. Wagner|Red Deff]]
 ''Ysée-A'' by [[Louis Thirion]]
 ''The verb of life'' by [[Michel Honaker]]
 ''Scorpions'' by [[Gérard Néry]]
 ''Les Forains du bord du gouffre'' by [[Pierre Pelot]]
 ''La Loi majeure'' by [[Don Hérial]]
 ''Les Ailes tranchées'' by [[Félix Chapel]]
 ''Zoomby'' by [[Vincent Gallaix]]
 ''Visiteurs d'apocalypse'' by [[Jean-Pierre Andrevon]]
 ''La Dame d'Alkoviak'' by [[Hugues Douriaux]]
 ''Le Ciel sous la pierre'' by [[Pierre Pelot]]
 ''Vous avez dit "humain" !'' by [[Piet Legay]]
 ''Dépression'' by [[François Sarkel]]
 ''Les Voies d'Almagiel'' by [[Gilles Thomas]]
 ''Safari mortel'' by [[Jean-Pierre Garen]]
 ''Return of Emeth'' by [[Michel Honaker]]
 ''Le Dirigeable certitude'' by [[Alain Paris]]
 ''Les Faucheurs de temps'' by [[Pierre Pelot]]
 ''Les Autos carnivores'' by [[Max Anthony]]
 ''Apollo XXV'' by [[Daniel Walther]]
 ''La Révolte des barons'' by [[Hugues Douriaux]]
 ''Les Fils du miroir fumant'' by [[Alain Paris]]
 ''Soleil de mort'' by [[Pierre Barbet (writer)|Pierre Barbet]]
 ''Emergency !'' by [[Piet Legay]]
 ''Le Temple de la mort turquoise'' by [[Félix Chapel]]
 ''Les Derniers anges'' by [[Christopher Stork]]
 ''King of ice'' by [[Michel Honaker]]
 ''Le Peuple pâle'' by [[Alain Paris]]
 ''Démons'' by [[Jean-Marc Ligny]]
 ''Hydres'' by [[Don Hérial]]
 ''Ylvain, rêve de vie'' by [[Ayerdhal]]
 ''La Légende des niveaux fermés'' by [[Gilles Thomas]]
 ''Chasse infernale'' by [[Jean-Pierre Garen]]
 ''Arasoth'' by [[Hugues Douriaux]]
 ''Sorciers'' by [[Jean-Marc Ligny]]
 ''Le Sang de Fulgavy'' by [[Félix Chapel]]
 ''Made, concerto pour salmen et bohême'' by [[Ayerdhal]]
 ''Le Rêveur des terres agglutinées'' by [[Roland C. Wagner]]
 ''Secret of Bashamay'' by [[Michel Honaker]]
 ''Ross et Berkel'' by [[Paul-Jean Hérault]]
 ''Comme une odeur de tombeau'' by [[Samuel Dharma]]
 ''Le Profanateur'' by [[Piet Legay]]
 ''La Naïa, hors limites'' by [[Ayerdhal]]
 ''Les Enfants de Pisauride'' by [[Jean-Pierre Andrevon]]
 ''Les Enfants de Vonia'' by [[Hugues Douriaux]]
 ''Pédric et Bo'' by [[Paul-Jean Hérault]]
 ''Rasalgethi'' by [[Jean-Marc Ligny]]
 ''L'Homme-requin'' by [[Jean-Christophe Chaumette]]
 ''Ely, l'esprit-miroir'' by [[Ayerdhal]]
 ''L'Ange aux ailes de lumière'' by [[Gilles Thomas]]
 ''Evil game'' by [[Michel Honaker]]
 ''Apex (M57)'' by [[Jean-Marc Ligny]]
 ''La Cité sous la terre'' by [[Jean-Christophe Chaumette]]
 ''Les Éphémères des sables'' by [[Félix Chapel]]
 ''L'Autoroute de l'aube'' by [[Roland C. Wagner]]
 ''Le Fils du grand Konnar'' by [[Pierre Pelot]]
 ''Le Gardien du cristal'' by [[Jean-Pierre Garen]]
 ''Les Ballades du temps futur'' by [[Hugues Douriaux]]
 ''Bérénice'' by [[Jean-Marc Ligny]]
 ''Aoni'' by [[Jean-Christophe Chaumette]]
 ''Le Cri du corps'' by [[Claude Ecken]]
 ''L'Antre du serpent'' by [[Michel Pagel]]

1991 
<li value="1795"> ''Troll'' by [[Michel Honaker]]
 ''Sur la piste des Rollmops'' by [[Pierre Pelot]]
 ''La Prophétie'' by [[Jean-Christophe Chaumette]]
 ''Panique chez les poissons solubles'' by [[Max Anthony]]
 ''Le Temps de l'effroi'' by [[Piet Legay]]
 ''Requiem pour une idole de cristal'' by [[Louis Thirion]]
 ''Le Refuge de l'agneau'' by [[Michel Pagel]]
 ''Rollmops dream'' by [[Pierre Pelot]]
 ''Promesse d'Ille'' by [[Ayerdhal]]
 ''Les Épées de cristal'' by [[Jean-Christophe Chaumette]]
 ''Le Monde d'en bas'' by [[Bertrand Passegué]]
 ''Viper'' by [[Red Deff]]
 ''Orbret'' by [[Hugues Douriaux]]
 ''Zelmiane'' by [[Hugues Douriaux]]
 ''Les Amants pourchassés'' by [[Hugues Douriaux]]
 ''Apocalypse junction'' by [[Michel Honaker]]
 ''Gilbert le barbant - le retour'' by [[Pierre Pelot]]
 ''Le Guerrier sans visage'' by [[Jean-Christophe Chaumette]]
 ''Honneur de chasse'' by [[Ayerdhal]]
 ''Le Temps des lumières'' by [[Piet Legay]]
 ''Les Maîtres des souterrains'' by [[Bertrand Passegué]]
 ''Les Pirates de Sylwa'' by [[Jean-Pierre Garen]]
 ''Le Voyageur solitaire'' by [[Jean-Marc Ligny]]
 ''La Guerre en ce jardin'' by [[Richard Canal]]
 ''Les Fêtes de Hrampa'' by [[Félix Chapel]]
 ''Chroniques du désespoir'' by [[Roland C. Wagner]]
 ''L'Île brûlée'' by [[Gilles Thomas]]
 ''Dark spirit'' by [[Michel Honaker]]
 ''Danger : mémoire'' by [[Paul-Jean Hérault]]
 ''L'Homme du sid'' by [[Alain Paris]]
 ''Ganja'' by [[Red Deff]]
 ''Le Temps des révélations'' by [[Piet Legay]]
 ''De bitume et de sang'' by [[Manuel Essard]]
 ''L'Ombre des Rhuls'' by [[Jean-Pierre Garen]]
 ''Un été à Zédong'' by [[Jean-Marc Ligny]]
 ''L'Écume du passé'' by [[Alain Paris]]
 ''Ultimes aventures en territoires fourbes'' by [[Pierre Pelot]]
 ''Le Choix du Ksin'' by [[Ayerdhal]]
 ''Le Cimetière des astronefs'' by [[Michel Pagel]]
 ''Celui-qui-n'est-pas-nommé'' by [[Alain Paris]]
 ''Le Fouilleur d'âmes'' by [[Michel Honaker]]
 ''Ce qu'il y avait derrière l'horizon'' by [[Jean-Pierre Andrevon]]
 ''Nivôse'' by [[Jean-Claude Dunyach]]
 ''Aigue-Marine'' by [[Jean-Claude Dunyach]]
 ''Astronef Mercure'' by [[Jean-Pierre Garen]]
 ''Les Mondes furieux'' by [[Albert Higon]]
 ''Chien bleu couronné'' by [[Raymond Milési]]
 ''Espion de l'étrange'' by [[Karel Dekk]]
 ''D'un lieu lointain nommé Soltrois'' by [[Gilles Thomas]]
 ''Roche-Lalheue'' by [[Hugues Douriaux]]
 ''Demain, une oasis'' by [[Ayerdhal]]
 ''Albatroys'' by [[Jean-Marc Ligny]]
 ''Cette crédille qui nous ronge'' by [[Roland C. Wagner]]
 ''Une si jolie prison'' by [[Manuel Essard]]
 ''Le Loupiot'' by [[Paul-Jean Hérault]]
 ''L'Ère du spatiopithèque'' by [[Pierre Barbet (writer)|Pierre Barbet]]
 ''Orages en terre de France'' by [[Michel Pagel]]
 ''Albatroys - 2'' by [[Jean-Marc Ligny]]
 ''L'Ouragan des enfants-dieux'' by [[François Rahier]]

1992 
<li value="1854"> ''La Planète des Lykans'' by [[Jean-Pierre Garen]]
 ''La Chimère infernale'' by [[Albert Higon]]
 ''La Colonne d'émeraude'' by [[Jean-Pierre Fontana]]
 ''La Jungle de pierre'' by [[Gilles Thomas]]
 ''Voleurs de silence'' by [[Jean-Claude Dunyach]]
 ''Malterre'' by [[Hugues Douriaux]]
 ''L'Énigme du squalus'' by [[Piet Legay]]
 ''Le Monde blanc'' by [[Laurent Genefort]]
 ''Le Camp des inadaptés'' by [[Jean-Pierre Garen]]
 ''L'Oreille absolue'' by [[Michel Honaker]]
 ''Psychosphère'' by [[Gilles Morris]]
 ''Le Gymnase de l'ogre'' by [[Marc Lemosquet]]
 ''La Cité des Mille Plaisirs'' by [[Hugues Douriaux]]
 ''Le Vaisseau-démon'' by [[Albert Higon]]
 ''Le Désert des cendres'' by [[Jean-Pierre Fontana]] and [[Alain Paris]]
 ''Le Monolithe noir'' by [[Bertrand Passegué]]
 ''La Déesse de Cimbariah'' by [[Hugues Douriaux]]
 ''Le Syndrome des baleines'' by [[Ayerdhal]]
 ''Elaï'' by [[Laurent Genefort]]
 ''Métacentre'' by [[Bertrand Passegué]]
 ''Le Monstre de Palathor'' by [[Hugues Douriaux]]
 ''Le Mystère Lyphine'' by [[Ayerdhal]]
 ''Révélations interdites'' by [[Piet Legay]]
 ''Horlemonde'' by [[Gilles Thomas]]
 ''Le Gouffre du volcan céleste'' by [[Hugues Douriaux]]
 ''Les Possédés du démon'' by [[Jean-Pierre Garen]]
 ''Labyrinth-jungle'' by [[Oscar Valetti]]
 ''Les Compagnons de la lune blême'' by [[Roger Facon]]
 ''Rinocérox'' by [[Serge Brussolo]]
 ''Recyclage'' by [[Jean-Pierre Garen]]
 ''Les Peaux-épaisses'' by [[Laurent Genefort]]
 ''Deltas'' by [[Alain Le Bussy]]
 ''Cybione'' by [[Ayerdhal]]
 ''La Porte des serpents'' by [[Gilles Thomas]]
 ''La Mandragore'' by [[Piet Legay]]
 ''Penta'' by [[Dominique Brotot]]
 ''Hors normes'' by [[Paul-Jean Hérault]]
 ''Saigneur de guerre'' by [[Manuel Essard]]
 ''Plug-in'' by [[Marc Lemosquet]]
 ''Les Gardiennes d'espérance'' by [[Pierre Debuys]]
 ''Capitaine suicide'' by [[Serge Brussolo]]
 ''Mission secrète'' by [[Jean-Pierre Garen]]
 ''L'Ombre et le fléau'' by [[Oscar Valetti]]
 ''Mascarad City'' by [[Lucas Gorka]]

1993 
<li value="1898"> ''Aqua'' by [[Jean-Marc Ligny]]
 ''Symphonie Pastorale'' by [[Hugues Douriaux]]
 ''Le Huitième cristal du Dr. Mygale'' by [[Max Anthony]]
 ''Awacs'' by [[Alain Paris]]
 ''Les Fruits sataniques'' by [[Alain Billy]]
 ''Magie sombre'' by [[Gilles Thomas]]
 ''La Falaise'' by Th. Cryde
 ''Le Temps et l'espace'' by [[Jean-Pierre Garen]]
 ''Abîmes'' by [[Serge Brussolo]]
 ''Les Guerriers de glace'' by [[Hugues Douriaux]]
 ''Tremblemer'' by [[Alain Le Bussy]]
 ''REZO'' by [[Laurent Genefort]]
 ''Boulevard des miroirs fantômes'' by [[Max Anthony]]
 ''Le Visage derrière la nuit'' by [[Maurice Périsset]]
 ''Roll over, Amundsen !'' by [[Jean-Claude Dunyach]]
 ''Chair inconnue'' by [[Oscar Valetti]]
 ''Rawâhlpurgis'' by [[Piet Legay]]
 ''Achéron'' by [[Alain Paris]]
 ''Les Moines noirs'' by [[Jean-Pierre Garen]]
 ''La Forteresse pourpre'' by [[Manuel Essard]]
 ''Crache-Béton'' by [[Serge Brussolo]]
 ''Déraag'' by [[Alain Le Bussy]]
 ''XYZ'' by [[Daniel Ichbiah]] and [[Yves Uzureau]]
 ''Les Ratés'' by [[Gilles Thomas]]
 ''Arago'' by [[Laurent Genefort]]
 ''Les Sortilèges de Maïn'' by [[Hugues Douriaux]]
 ''Les Mangeurs de viande'' by [[Jean-Pierre Garen]]
 ''L'Autoroute sauvage'' by [[Gilles Thomas]]
 ''De l'autre côté du mur des ténèbres'' by [[Serge Brussolo]]
 ''Le Sang des mondes'' by [[Jean-Pierre Vernay]]
 ''Cobaye'' by [[Marc Lemosquet]]
 ''Les Yeux de la terre folle'' by [[Philippe Pastor]]
 ''Neurovision'' by [[Dominique Brotot]]
 ''Envercoeur'' by [[Alain Le Bussy]]
 ''Haute-Enclave'' by [[Laurent Genefort]]
 ''Cyberkiller'' by [[Jean-Marc Ligny]]
 ''La Flûte de verre froid'' by [[Gilles Thomas]]

1994 
<li value="1935"> ''Polytan'' by [[Ayerdhal]]
 ''Les Mines de Sarkal'' by [[Jean-Pierre Garen]]
 ''Warrior'' by [[Hugues Douriaux]]
 ''Les Sentinelles d'Almoha'' by [[Serge Brussolo]]
 ''Garmalia'' by [[Alain Le Bussy]]
 ''Les Voleurs d'organes'' by [[Dominique Brotot]]
 ''Les Portes sans retour'' by [[Gilles Thomas]]
 ''Pour des soleils froids'' by [[Jean-Louis Trudel]]
 ''Le Peintre des orages'' by [[Alain Billy]]
 ''Les Chasseurs de sève'' by [[Laurent Genefort]]
 ''La Porte de flamme'' by [[Hugues Douriaux]]
 ''Nickel le Petit'' by [[Christophe Kauffman]]
 ''Les Adorateurs de Kaal'' by [[Jean-Pierre Garen]]
 ''Quête impériale'' by [[Alain Le Bussy]]
 ''Jalin Ka'' by [[Christophe Kauffman]]
 ''Shaan !'' by [[Piet Legay]]
 ''L'Araignée de verre'' by [[Jean-Pierre Garen]]
 ''Parasol 27'' by [[Alain Billy]]
 ''La Route des soleils'' by [[Wildy Petoud]]
 ''La Troisième lune'' by [[Laurent Genefort]]
 ''Le Ressuscité de l'Atlantide'' by [[Jean-Louis Trudel]]

1995 
<li value="1956"> ''Yorg de l'île'' by [[Alain Le Bussy]]
 ''Le Dernier des Aramandars'' by [[Hugues Douriaux]]
 ''Rork des plaines'' by [[Alain Le Bussy]]
 ''Une planète pour Copponi'' by [[Hugo Van Gaert]]
 ''Hou des machines'' by [[Alain Le Bussy]]
 ''Le Labyrinthe de chair'' by [[Laurent Genefort]]
 ''Profession : cadavre'' by [[Serge Brussolo]]
 ''La Guerre des cercles'' by [[Jean-Claude Dunyach]]
 ''Theophano 960'' by [[Pierre Stolze]]
 ''Soleil fou'' by [[Alain Le Bussy]]
 ''De chair et de fer'' by [[Laurent Genefort]]
 ''Le Prisonnier de l'entre-deux-mondes'' by [[Hugues Douriaux]]
 ''Acherra'' by [[Gilles Thomas]]
 ''Offren'' by [[Gilles Thomas]]
 ''Promenade du bistouri'' by [[Serge Brussolo]]
 ''Les Hommes du maître'' by [[Jean-Pierre Garen]]
 ''Chatinika'' by [[Alain Le Bussy]]
 ''Le Chineur de l'espace'' by [[Paul-Jean Hérault]]

1996 
<li value="1974"> ''L'Homme qui n'existait plus'' by [[Laurent Genefort]]
 ''Interférences'' by [[Hugues Douriaux]]
 ''Justice galactique'' by [[Jean-Pierre Garen]]
 ''Phalènes'' by [[Philippe Guy]]
 ''Les Chemins de Pilduin'' by [[Claude Castan]]
 ''Jana des couloirs'' by [[Alain Le Bussy]]
 ''Lyane'' by [[Laurent Genefort]]
 ''Jorvan de la mer'' by [[Alain Le Bussy]]
 ''Djamol de Kîv'' by [[Alain Le Bussy]]
 ''La Route de Stelian'' by [[Claude Castan]]
 ''Les Allées de la gloire'' by [[Claude Castan]]
 ''La Montagne rouge'' by [[Jean-Pierre Garen]]
 ''Ceux qui ne voulaient pas mourir'' by [[Paul-Jean Hérault]]
 ''Les Pistes d'Ahran'' by [[Claude Castan]]
 ''La Balle du néant'' by [[Roland C. Wagner]]
 ''Les Pierres de lumière'' by [[Hugues Douriaux]]
 ''Alice qui dormait'' by [[Franck Morrisset]]
 ''La Mâchoire du dragon'' by [[G. Elton Ranne]]
 ''Le Dieu avide'' by [[Alain Le Bussy]]
 ''La Compagnie des fous'' by [[Laurent Genefort]]
 ''Les Voies du ciel'' by [[Laurent Genefort]]
 ''Les Rails d'incertitude'' by [[G.-J. Arnaud]]
 ''L'Ange et la mort'' by [[Franck Morrisset]]
 ''Autant en emporte le divan'' by [[Patrice Duvic]]
 ''Les Ravisseurs quantiques'' by [[Roland C. Wagner]]
 ''Les Oiseaux de cuir'' by [[Gilles Thomas]]

1997 
<li value="2000"> ''Wonderland'' by [[Serge Lehman]]
 ''L'Odyssée de l'espèce'' by [[Roland C. Wagner]]

References
{{reflist}}

[[Category:French science fiction]]
[[Category:Editorial collections]]